This is a list of notable biologists with a biography in Wikipedia. It includes zoologists, botanists, biochemists, ornithologists, entomologists, malacologists, naturalists and other specialities.

A

Ab–Ag 
John Jacob Abel (1857–1938), American biochemist and pharmacologist, founder of the first department of pharmacology in the United States.
John Abelson (born 1938), American biologist with expertise in biophysics, biochemistry, and genetics
Richard J. Ablin (born 1940), American immunologist. Research on prostate cancer.  Discovered prostate-specific antigen (PSA) which led to the development of the PSA test
Erik Acharius (1757–1819), Swedish botanist who studied lichens
Gary Ackers (1939–2011), American biophysicist who worked on thermodynamics of macromolecules.
Gilbert Smithson Adair (1896–1979), British protein chemist who  identified cooperative binding of oxygen binding haemoglobin.
Arthur Adams (1820–1878), English physician and naturalist who classified crustaceans and molluscs
Michel Adanson (1727–1806), French naturalist who studied the plants and animals of Senegal
Julius Adler (born 1930), American biochemist and geneticist known for work on chemotaxis.
Monique Adolphe (born 1932), French cell biologist, pioneer of cell culture
Edgar Douglas Adrian (1st Baron Adrian) (1889–1977), British electrophysiologist, Nobel Prize in Physiology or Medicine (1932) for research on neurons
Adam Afzelius (1750–1837), Swedish botanist who collected botanical specimens later acquired by Uppsala University
Carl Adolph Agardh (1785–1859), Swedish botanist who classified plant orders and classes
Jacob Georg Agardh (1813–1901), Swedish botanist known for classification of algae
Louis Agassiz (1807–1873), Swiss zoologist who studied the classification of fish; opponent of natural selection
Alexander Agassiz (1835–1910), American zoologist, son of Louis Agassiz, expert of marine biology and on mining
Nikolaus Ager (also Nicolas Ager, Agerius) (1568–1634), French botanist, author of De Anima Vegetativa

Al–An 
Nagima Aitkhozhina (1946–2020), Kazakh molecular biologist,  structural and functional organisation of the genome of higher organisms and the molecular mechanisms of regulation of its expression.
William Aiton (1731–1793), Scottish botanist, director of the botanical garden at Kew
Bruce Alberts (born 1938), American biochemist, former President of the United States National Academy of Sciences, known for studying the protein complexes involved in chromosome replication, and for the book  Molecular Biology of the Cell 
Robert Alberty (1921–2014), American physical biochemist, with many contributions to enzyme kinetics.
Alfred William Alcock (1859–1933), British systematist of numerous species, aspects of biology and physiology of fishes
Nora Lilian Alcock (1874–1972), British pioneer in plant pathology who did research on fungal diseases
Boyd Alexander (1873–1910), English ornithologist who made surveys of birds in the Gold Coast (now Ghana), and the Bonin Islands
Richard D. Alexander (1929–2018), American evolutionary biologist whose scientific pursuits integrated systematics, ecology, evolution, natural history and behaviour
Salim Ali (1896–1987), Indian ornithologist who conducted systematic bird surveys across India
Frédéric-Louis Allamand (1736–1809), Swiss botanist who described several plant genera
Warder Clyde Allee (1885–1955), American zoologist and ecologist, identified the Allee effect (correlation between population density and individual fitness)
Joel Asaph Allen (1838–1921), American zoologist who studied birds and mammals, known for Allen's rule
Jorge Allende (born 1934), Chilean biochemist known for contributions to the understanding of protein biosynthesis
George James Allman (1812–1898), British naturalist who did important work on the gymnoblasts
June Dalziel Almeida (1930–2007), Scottish virologist who pioneered techniques for characterizing viruses, and discovered Coronavirus
Tikvah Alper (1909–1995), South African radiobiologist who showed that the infectious agent of scrapie contains no nucleic acid
Prospero Alpini (1553–1617), Italian botanist, the first in Europe to describe coffee and banana plants 
Sidney Altman (1939–2022), Canadian-born molecular biologist, winner of the 1989 Nobel Prize in Chemistry for his work on RNA

Am–As 
Bruce Ames (born 1928), American biochemist, inventor of the Ames test for mutagenicity (sometimes regarded as a test for carcinogenicity)
John E. Amoore (1939–1998), British biochemist and zoologist, originator of the stereochemical theory of olfaction.
José Alberto de Oliveira Anchieta (1832–1897), Portuguese naturalist who identified many new species of mammals, birds, amphibians and reptiles
Mortimer Louis Anson (1901–1968), American biochemist and protein chemist who proposed that protein folding was reversible
Jakob Johan Adolf Appellöf (1857–1921), Swedish marine zoologist who made important contributions to knowledge of cephalopods
Agnes Robertson Arber (1879–1960), British plant morphologist and anatomist, historian of botany and philosopher of biology
Aristotle (384 BC–322 BC), Greek philosopher, sometimes regarded as the first biologist, he described hundreds of kinds of animals
Emily Arnesen (1867–1928), Norwegian zoologist who worked on sponges
Frances Arnold (born 1956), American biochemist and biochemical engineer, pioneer of the use of directed evolution to engineer enzymes. 
Ruth Arnon (born 1933), Israeli biochemist, who works on anti-cancer and influenza vaccinations. She participated in developing the multiple sclerosis drug Copaxone.
Peter Artedi (1705–1735), Swedish naturalist who developed the science of ichthyology
Gilbert Ashwell (1916–2014), American biochemist, pioneer in the study of cell receptor
Ana Aslan (1897–1988), Romanian biologist who studied arthritis and other aspects of aging
William Astbury (1898–1961), British physicist, molecular biologist and X-ray crystallographer

At–Az 
David Attenborough (born 1926), British natural history broadcaster
Jean Baptiste Audebert (1759–1800), French naturalist. Primarily an artist, he illustrated books of natural history, including Histoire naturelle des singes, des makis [lemurs] et des galéopithèques
Jean Victoire Audouin (1797–1841), French zoologist: entomologist, herpetologist, ornithologist and malacologist
John James Audubon (1786–1851), French and American ornithologist and illustrator, who identified 25 new species
Charlotte Auerbach (1899–1994), German and British geneticist, founded the discipline of mutagenesis after discovering the effect of mustard gas on fruit flies
Richard Axel (born 1946), American Nobel Prize–winning physiologist who discovered how to insert foreign DNA into a host cell
Julius Axelrod (1912–2004), American biochemist, winner of the 1970 Nobel Prize in Physiology or Medicine for his research on catecholamine neurotransmitters
Francisco Ayala (born 1934), Spanish-American evolutionary biologist and philosopher
William Orville Ayres (1817–1887), American physician and ichthyologist with publications in popular sources
Félix de Azara (1746–1811), Spanish naturalist who described more than 350 South American birds

B

Ba
Charles Cardale Babington (1808–1895), British botanist and archaeologist
Churchill Babington (1821–1889), British classical scholar, archaeologist and botanist
John Bachman (1790–1874), American ornithologist; also one of the first scientists to argue that blacks and whites are the same species
Curt Backeberg (1894–1966), German horticulturist, known for classification of cacti
Karl Ernst von Baer (1792–1876), German naturalist (in Estonia), biologist, geologist, meteorologist, geographer, and a founding father of embryology
Liberty Hyde Bailey (1858–1954), American botanist, one of the first to recognize the importance of Gregor Mendel's work
Donna Baird (thesis 1980), American epidemiologist and evolutionary-population biologist, concerned with women's health
Spencer Fullerton Baird (1823–1887),  American naturalist, ornithologist, ichthyologist and herpetologist who collected and classified many species
Scott Baker (born 1954), American marine biologist, cetacean expert
John Hutton Balfour (1808–1884), Scottish botanist, author  of numerous books, including Manual of Botany
Clinton Ballou (1923–2021), American biochemist who worked on the metabolism of carbohydrates and the structures of microbial cell walls
Henri Heim de Balsac (1899–1979), zoologist.
David Baltimore (born 1938), American biologist, known for work on viruses. Nobel Prize in Physiology or Medicine 1975
Outram Bangs (1863–1932), American zoologist who collected many bird species; author of more than  70 books and articles, 55 of them on mammals
Joseph Banks (1743–1820), English naturalist, botanist who collected 30,000 plant specimens and  discovered 1,400.
Robert Bárány (1876–1936), Austro-Hungarian (later Swedish) physician. Nobel Prize in Physiology or Medicine (1914) for studies of the vestibular system
Horace Barker (1907–2000), American biochemist and microbiologist
Ben Barres (1954–2017), American neurobiologist who studied mammalian glial cells of the central nervous system 
Benjamin Smith Barton (1766–1815), American botanist, author of Elements of botany, or Outlines of the natural history of vegetables, the first American textbook of botany
John Bartram (1699–1777), American botanist, described by Carl Linnaeus as the "greatest natural botanist in the world"
William Bartram (1739–1823), American botanist, ornithologist, natural historian, and explorer, author of Bartram's Travels (as now known)
Anton de Bary (1831–1888), German  surgeon, botanist, microbiologist, and mycologist, considered a founding father of plant pathology (phytopathology) as well as the founder of modern mycology
Dorothea Bate (1878–1951), Welsh  palaeontologist and pioneer of archaeozoology who studied fossils
Henry Walter Bates (1825–1892), English naturalist who gave the first scientific account of mimicry
Patrick Bateson (1938–2017), English biologist and science writer, president of the Zoological Society of London
August Johann Georg Karl Batsch (1762–1802), German botanist, mycologist who discovered almost 200 species of mushrooms
Gaspard Bauhin (1560–1624), Swiss botanist who introduced binomial nomenclature into taxonomy, foreshadowing Linnaeus

Be–Bi
George Beadle (1903–1989), American geneticist. Nobel Prize in Physiology or Medicine 1958 for discovery of the role of genes in regulating biochemical reactions within cells. 7th president of the University of Chicago.
Johann Matthäus Bechstein (1757–1822), German naturalist, ornithologist, entomologist and herpetologist known for his treatise on singing birds Naturgeschichte der Stubenvögel
Rollo Beck (1870–1950), American ornithologist known for collecting birds and reptiles, including three of the last four individuals of the Pinta Island tortoise
Jon Beckwith (born 1935), American microbiologist and geneticist who worked on bacterial genetics.
Charles William Beebe (1877–1962), American biologist, known for work on pheasants, and numerous books on natural history
Martinus Beijerinck (1851–1931), Dutch microbiologist and botanist who discovered viruses and investigated nitrogen fixation by bacteria
Helmut Beinert (1913–2007), German-American biochemist, a pioneer of the use of electron paramagnetic resonance in biological systems
Thomas Bell (1792–1880), English zoologist, surgeon and writer who described and classified Darwin's reptile specimens and crustaceans 
David Bellamy (1933–2019), English broadcaster, activist and ecologist
Boris Pavlovich Belousov (1893–1970), Soviet chemist and biophysicist who discovered the Belousov–Zhabotinsky reaction
Stephen J. Benkovic (born 1938), American bioorganic chemist specializing in mechanistic enzymology
Edward Turner Bennett (1797–1836), English zoologist who described a new species of African crocodile
George Bentham (1800–1884), English botanist, known for his taxonomy of plants, written with Joseph Dalton Hooker, Genera Plantarum
Jacques Benoit (1896–1982), French biologist, physician. One of the pioneers of neuroendocrinology and photobiology.
Robert Bentley (1821–1893), English botanist, known for Medicinal Plants (four volumes)
Wilson Teixeira Beraldo (1917–1998), Brazilian physician and physiologist, co-discoverer of bradykinin
Paul Berg (1926–2023), American biochemist known for work on gene splicing of recombinant DNA.
Hans Berger (1873–1941), German neuroscientist, one of the founders of electroencephalography
Carl Bergmann (1814–1865), German anatomist, physiologist and biologist who developed Bergmann's rule relating population and body sizes with ambient temperature
Rudolph Bergh (1824–1909), Danish physician and zoologist who studied sexually transmitted diseases, and also molluscs
Claude Bernard (1813–1878), French physiologist, father of the concepts of the milieu intérieur and homeostasis
Samuel Stillman Berry (1887–1984), American zoologist who established 401 mollusc taxa, and worked on chitons, cephalopods, and also land snails
Thomas Bewick (1753–1828), English ornithologist and illustrator, author of A General History of Quadrupeds
Gabriel Bibron (1806–1848), French zoologist, expert on reptiles and author (with André Marie Constant Duméril) of Erpétologie Générale
Klaus Biemann (1926–2016), Austrian chemist, the "father of organic mass spectrometry"
Ann Bishop (1899–1990), English biologist who specialized in protozoology and parasitology
Biswamoy Biswas (1923–1994), Indian ornithologist who studied, in particular, the birds of Nepal and Bhutan

Bl–Bo
Elizabeth Blackburn (born 1948), Australian/US Nobel Prize–winning researcher in the field of telomeres and the "telomerase" enzyme
John Blackwall (1790–1881), British entomologist, author of A History of the Spiders of Great Britain and Ireland
Henri Marie Ducrotay de Blainville (1777–1850), French zoologist, taxonomic authority on numerous zoological species,  including Blainville's beaked whale
Albert Francis Blakeslee (1874–1954), American botanist, best known for research on Jimsonweed and the sexuality of fungi
Thomas Blakiston (1832–1891), English naturalist. "Blakiston's Line" separates animal species of Hokkaidō and northern Asia, from  those of Honshū and  southern Asia. 
Frank Nelson Blanchard (1888–1937), American herpetologist who described new subspecies of snakes.
Frjeda Blanchard (1889–1977), American plant and animal geneticist who demonstrated Mendelian inheritance in reptiles.
William Thomas Blanford (1832–1905), English geologist and naturalist, editor of The Fauna of British India, Including Ceylon and Burma.
Pieter Bleeker (1819–1878), Dutch ichthyologist whose papers described 511 new genera and 1,925 new species
Günter Blobel (1936–2018), German Nobel Prize-winning biologist who discovered that newly synthesized proteins contain "address tags" which direct them to the proper location within the cell
Konrad Emil Bloch (1912–2000), German-American biochemist who worked on cholesterol and fatty acid metabolism
Steven Block (born 1952), American biophysicist who measured the mechanical properties of single bio-molecules
David Mervyn Blow (1931–2004), British X-ray crystallographer noted for work on protein structure
Carl Ludwig Blume (Karel Lodewijk Blume, 1789–1862), German-Dutch botanist who studied the flora of southern Asia, particularly Java
Johann Friedrich Blumenbach (1752–1840), German physiologist and anthropologist who classified human races on the basis of skull structure
Edward Blyth (1810–1873), English zoologist who classified many birds of India
José Vicente Barbosa du Bocage (1823–1907), Portuguese zoologist with many papers on mammals, birds, reptiles, amphibians, fishes, and others
Pieter Boddaert (1730–1795/1796), Dutch physician and naturalist who named many mammals, birds and other animals
Brendan J. M. Bohannan (no date information), American microbial and evolutionary biologist, expert on the microbes of Amazonia
Charles Lucien Bonaparte (1803–1857), French naturalist who coined Latin names for many bird species
James Bond (1900–1989), American ornithologist, author of Birds of the West Indies
Franco Andrea Bonelli (1784–1830), Italian ornithologist, author of a Catalogue of the Birds of Piedmont, which described 262 species
August Gustav Heinrich von Bongard (1786–1839), German botanist in St Petersburg, one the first botanists to describe the plants of Alaska
John Tyler Bonner (1920–2019), American developmental biologist, expert on slime moulds
Charles Bonnet (1720–1793), Genevan naturalist who published work on many subjects, including insects and plants
Aimé Bonpland (1773–1858), French explorer and botanist who collected and classified about 6,000 plants unknown in Europe
Jules Bordet (1870–1961), Belgian immunologist and microbiologist, winner of the 1919 Nobel Prize in Physiology or Medicine for his discovery of the complement system in the immune system
Antonina Georgievna Borissova (1903–1970), Russian botanist who specialized on the flora of the deserts and semi-desert of central Asia
Norman Borlaug (1914–2009), American agricultural scientist, humanitarian, Nobel Peace Prize, and the father of the Green Revolution
Louis Augustin Guillaume Bosc (1759–1828), French botanist, invertebrate zoologist, and entomologist, who made a systematic examination of the mushrooms of the southern United States
George Albert Boulenger (1858–1937), Belgian and British zoologist, author of 19 monographs on fishes, amphibians, and reptiles
Jules Bourcier (1797–1873), French ornithologist, expert on hummingbirds
Paul D. Boyer (1918–2018), American biochemist who was awarded the Nobel Prize in 1997 for studies of ATP synthase

Br–Bu
Margaret Bradshaw (born 1941), New Zealand Antarctic researcher who has worked on Devonian invertebrate palaeontology
Johann Friedrich von Brandt (1802–1879), German-Russian naturalist who described various birds; also an entomologist, specialising in beetles and millipedes
Sara Branham Matthews (1888–1962), American microbiologist and physician best known for her research into the isolation and treatment of Neisseria meningitidis
Christian Ludwig Brehm (1787–1864), German ornithologist who described many German species of birds
Alfred Brehm (1829–1884), German zoologist, author of many works on animals and especially birds
Sydney Brenner (1927–2019), British molecular biologist who worked on the genetic code, and later established the roundworm Caenorhabditis elegans as a model organism for developmental biology. Nobel Prize in Physiology or Medicine (2002)
Thomas Mayo Brewer (1814–1880), American naturalist, specializing in ornithology and oology (the study of birds' eggs)
William Brewster (1851–1919), American ornithologist, curator of mammals and birds at  Harvard. 
Mathurin Jacques Brisson (1723–1806), French zoologist, author of Le Règne animal and  Ornithologie
Nathaniel Lord Britton (1859–1934), American botanist, coauthor of Illustrated Flora of the Northern United States, Canada, and the British Possessions
Thomas D. Brock (1926–2021), American microbiologist who discovered of hyperthermophiles such as Thermus aquaticus
Adolphe Theodore Brongniart (1801–1876), French botanist, author of many works, including Histoire des végétaux fossiles
Robert Broom (1866–1951), South African paleontologist, author many many papers and books, including The mammal-like reptiles of South Africa and the origin of mammals
Adrian John Brown (1852–1920), British expert on brewing and malting, pioneer of enzyme kinetics
James H. Brown (born 1942), American ecologist known for his metabolic theory of ecology
Patrick O. Brown (born 1954), American biochemist who has developed experimental methods with DNA microarrays to investigate genome organization
Robert Brown (1773–1858), Scottish botanist known for pioneering use of the microscope in botany
David Bruce (1855–1931), Scottish pathologist and microbiologist who investigated Malta fever (now called brucellosis) and discovered trypanosomes
Jean Guillaume Bruguière (1750–1798), French naturalist, mainly interested in molluscs and other invertebrates
Thomas Bruice (1925–2019), American bioorganic chemist, pioneer of chemical biology
Morten Thrane Brünnich (1737–1827), Danish zoologist, author of Ornithologia Borealis and Ichthyologia Massiliensis
Francis Buchanan-Hamilton (1762–1829), Scottish zoologist and botanist who studied plants and fishes in India
Eduard Buchner (1860–1917), German chemist and physiologist who overthrew the doctrine of vitalism by showing that fermentation occurred in cell-free extracts of yeast
Linda B. Buck (born 1947), American physiologist noted for work on the olfactory system. Nobel Prize in Physiology or Medicine (2004).
Buffon (Georges-Louis Leclerc, Comte de Buffon, 1707–1788), French naturalist. Author of many works in evolution, including Histoire naturelle, générale et particulière.
Walter Buller (1838–1906), New Zealand naturalist, a dominant figure in New Zealand ornithology. Author of A History of the Birds of New Zealand.
Alexander G. von Bunge (1803–1890), German-Russian botanist who studied Mongolian flora.
Luther Burbank (1849–1926), American horticulturalist who developed more than 800 strains and varieties of plants, many of commercial importance
Hermann Burmeister (1807–1892), German Argentinian zoologist, entomologist, herpetologist, and botanist, who described many new species of amphibians and reptiles
Frank Macfarlane Burnet (1899–1985), Australian virologist. Nobel Prize in 1960 for predicting acquired immune tolerance and for developing the theory of clonal selection.
Carolyn Burns (born 1942), New Zealand ecologist who studies the  physiology and population dynamics of southern hemisphere zooplankton and food-web interactions
Robert H. Burris (1914–2010), American biochemist, expert on nitrogen fixation
Carlos Bustamante (born 1951), Peruvian-American biophysicist who uses "molecular tweezers" to manipulate DNA for biochemical experiments
Ernesto Bustamante (born 1950), Peruvian biochemist, specialist in mitochondria demonstrated the importance of mitochondrial hexokinase in glycolysis in rapidly growing malignant tumour cells. He currently works on DNA paternity testing.

C

Ca 
Jean Cabanis (1816–1906), German ornithologist, founder of the Journal für Ornithologie
Ángel Cabrera (1879–1960), Spanish zoologist, author of South American Mammals
George Caley (1770–1829), English explorer and botanist, discoverer of Mount Banks, Australia
Rudolf Jakob Camerarius (1665–1721), German botanist, chiefly known for studies of the reproductive organs of plants
Augustin Pyramus de Candolle (1778–1841), Swiss botanist who documented many plant families and created a new plant classification system
Charles Cantor (born 1942), American biophysicist, known for pulse field gel electrophoresis, and as Director of the Human Genome Project
Elizabeth P. Carpenter (no date information), British structural biologist, professor
Philip Pearsall Carpenter (1819–1877), British conchologist,  author of Catalogue of the collection of Mazatlan shells, in the British Museum: collected by Frederick Reigen
Alexis Carrel (1873–1944), French biologist and surgeon, winner of the 1912 Nobel Prize in Physiology or Medicine for his work on sutures and organ transplants, advocate of eugenics
Elie-Abel Carrière (1818–1896), French botanist, an authority on conifers who described many new species
Clodoveo Carrión Mora (1883–1957), Ecuadorian paleontologist and naturalist who discovered many species and one genus
Sean B. Carroll (born 1960), American evolutionary development biologist, author of The Making of the Fittest: DNA and the Ultimate Forensic Record of Evolution and other books
Rachel Carson (1907–1964), American marine biologist, author of Silent Spring
George Washington Carver (1860–1943), American agriculturist, author of bulletins on crop production, including How to Grow the Peanut and 105 Ways of Preparing it for Human Consumption
John Cassin (1813–1869), American ornithologist, who named many birds not described in the works of his predecessors
Alexandre de Cassini (1781–1832), French botanist who named many flowering plants and new genera in the sunflower family, many of them from North America
Amy Castle (1880–1971), New Zealand entomologist, who worked primarily on the Lepidoptera
William E. Castle (1867–1962), American geneticist who contributed to the mathematical foundations of Mendelian genetics, and anticipated what is now known as the Hardy–Weinberg law.
Mark Catesby (1683–1749), English naturalist who studied flora and fauna in the New World. Author of Natural History of Carolina, Florida and the Bahama Islands

Ce–Ch 
Thomas Cech (born 1947), American biochemist who discovered catalytic RNA, Nobel Prize in 1989
Andrea Cesalpino (1519–1603), Italian botanist who classified plants according to their fruits and seeds, rather than alphabetically or by medicinal properties
Francesco Cetti (1726–1778), Italian zoologist, author of  Storia Naturale di Sardegna (Natural History of Sardinia)
Carlos Chagas (1879–1934), Brazilian physician who identified Trypanosoma cruzi as cause of Chagas disease
Adelbert von Chamisso (Louis Charles Adélaïde de Chamissot, 1781–1838), German botanist, whose most important contribution was the description of many Mexican trees
Britton Chance (1913–2010), American biochemist, inventor of the stopped-flow method
Min Chueh Chang (1908–1991),  Chinese-American reproductive biologist who studied the fertilisation process in mammalian reproduction, with work that led to the first test tube baby
Jean-Pierre Changeux (born 1936), French biochemist and neuroscientist, originator of the allosteric model of cooperativity
Frank Michler Chapman (1864–1945), American ornithologist, who promoted the use of photography in ornithology, especially in his book Bird Studies With a Camera.
Erwin Chargaff (1905–2002), Austrian-American biochemist known for Chargaff's rules
Emmanuelle Charpentier (born 1968), French microbiologist, geneticist and biochemist who discovered genome editing with CRISPR. 
Martha Chase (1927–2003), American biologist who carried out the Hershey–Chase experiment, which showed that genetic information is held and transmitted by DNA, not by protein
Thomas Frederic Cheeseman (1846–1923), New Zealand botanist and naturalist with wide-ranging interests, including sea slugs
Sergei Chetverikov (1880–1959), Russian population geneticist who showed how early genetic theories applied to natural populations, and thus contributed towards the modern synthesis of evolutionary theory
Charles Chilton (1860–1929), New Zealand zoologist with 130 papers on crustaceans, mostly amphipods, isopods and decapods, from all around the world, but especially from New Zealand
Carl Chun (1852–1914), German marine biologist specializing in cephalopods and plankton. He discovered and named the vampire squid
Aaron Ciechanover (born 1947). Israeli biochemist known for work on protein turnover, for which he was awarded the Nobel Prize in 2004

Cl–Co 
Albert Claude (1899–1983), Belgian-American cell biologist who developed cell fractionation; Nobel Prize 1974
W. Wallace Cleland (1930–2013). American biochemist known for work on enzyme kinetics and mechanism
Nathan Cobb (1859–1932), American biologist who described over 1000 different nematode species and laid the foundations of nematode taxonomy
Leonard Cockayne (1855–1934), New Zealand botanist especially active  in plant ecology and theories of hybridisation
Alfred Cogniaux (1841–1916), Belgian botanist who worked especially with orchids
Stanley Cohen (1922–2020), American biochemist, Nobel Prize in Physiology or Medicine (1986) for his discovery of growth factors
Edwin Joseph Cohn (1892–1953), American protein chemist known for studies on blood and the physical chemistry of protein
Mildred Cohn (1913–2009), American pioneer in the use of nuclear magnetic resonance to study enzymes
James J. Collins (born 1965), American biologist, synthetic biology and systems biology pioneer
Timothy Abbott Conrad (1803–1877), American paleontologist and naturalist who  studied the shells of the Tertiary and Cretaceous formations, as well as existing species of molluscs
James Graham Cooper (1830–1902), American surgeon and naturalist who contributed to both zoology and botany
Edward Drinker Cope (1840–1897), American paleontologist and comparative anatomist, also a herpetologist and ichthyologist, and founder of the Neo-Lamarckism school of thought
Carl Ferdinand Cori (1896–1984), Czech-American biochemist and pharmacologist, 1947 Nobel Prize in Physiology or Medicine for work on the Cori cycle
Gerty Cori (1886–1957),  Czech-American biochemist, first American woman to win a Nobel Prize in science (Physiology or Medicine, 1947), for unraveling the mechanism of glycogen metabolism
Charles B. Cory (1857–1921), American ornithologist who collected many birds. Author of The Birds of Haiti and San Domingo and other books.
Emanuel Mendes da Costa (1717–1791), English botanist, naturalist, philosopher, author of A Natural History of Fossils, British Conchology, and other books
Elliott Coues (1842–1899), American army surgeon, historian, ornithologist, and author of Key to North American Birds, did much to promote the systematic study of ornithology
Marjorie Courtenay-Latimer (1907–2004), South African zoologist who discovered the Coelacanth
Jacques-Yves Cousteau (1910–1997), French naval officer, explorer, conservationist, filmmaker, innovator, scientist, photographer, author and researcher who studied the sea and all forms of life in water
Miguel Rolando Covian (1913–1992), Argentine-Brazilian neurophysiologist known for research on the neurophysiology of the limbic system, regarded as the father of Brazilian neurophysiology
Frederick Vernon Coville (1867–1937), American botanist, author of Botany of the Death Valley Expedition

Cr–Cu 
Robert K. Crane, (1919–2010), American biochemist who discovered sodium–glucose cotransport
Lucy Cranwell (1907–2000), New Zealand botanist who organized the Cheeseman herbarium of about 10,000 specimens in Auckland
Philipp Jakob Cretzschmar (1786–1845), German physician and zoologist (especially birds and mammals)
Francis Crick (1916–2004), British molecular biologist, biophysicist and neuroscientist, best known for discovering the structure of DNA (with James Watson); Nobel Prize 1962
Joseph Charles Hippolyte Crosse (1826–1898), French conchologist, expert on molluscs, co-editor of the Journal de Conchyliologie
Nicholas Culpeper (1616–1654), English botanist, author of The English Physitian
Allan Cunningham (1791–1839), English botanist, "King's Collector for the Royal Garden at Kew" (in Australia)
Gordon Herriot Cunningham (1892–1962), New Zealand mycologist who published extensively on the taxonomy of fungi
Kathleen Curtis (1892–1993), New Zealand mycologist and plant pathologist,  a founder of plant pathology in New Zealand
William Curtis (1746–1799), English botanist, author of Flora Londinensis
Georges Cuvier (1769–1832), French naturalist, author of Le Règne Animal (the Animal Kingdom), the "founding father of paleontology"

D

Da 
Valerie Daggett (thesis 1990), American bioengineer who simulates proteins and other biomolecules by molecular dynamics
Anders Dahl (1751–1789), Swedish botanist whose name is recalled in the Dahlia, author of  Observationes botanicae circa systema vegetabilium
William Healey Dall (1845–1927), American malacologist, one of the earliest scientific explorers of interior Alaska. He described many mollusks of the Pacific Northwest of America
Keith Dalziel (1921–1994), British biochemist, pioneer in systematizing the kinetics of two-substrate enzyme-catalysed reactions
Carl Peter Henrik Dam (1895–1976), Danish physiologist who discovered vitamin K
Marguerite Davis (1887–1967), American biochemist, co-discoverer of vitamins A and B
Jivanayakam Cyril Daniel (1927–2011), Indian naturalist, director of the Bombay Natural History Society, author of The Book of Indian Reptiles
Charles Darwin (1809–1882), British naturalist, author of The Origin of Species, in which he expounded the theory of natural selection, the starting point of modern evolutionary biology
Erasmus Darwin (1731–1802), English physician and naturalist, founding member of the Lunar Society, grandfather of Charles Darwin
Jean Dausset (1916–2009), French immunologist who worked on the major histocompatibility complex
Charles Davenport (1866–1944), American biologist and eugenicist, founded the Eugenics Record Office at Cold Spring Harbor Laboratory
Gertrude Crotty Davenport (1866–1946), American zoologist prominent in the eugenics movement
Armand David (Père David) (1826–1900), French zoologist and botanist, commissioned by the Jardin des Plantes to undertake scientific journeys through China 
Bernard Davis (1916–1994), American biologist who worked on microbial physiology and metabolism
Richard Dawkins (born 1941), British evolutionary biologist and writer of popular science, author of The Selfish Gene, The Blind Watchmaker, The God Delusion and other influential books
Margaret Oakley Dayhoff (1925–1983), American biochemist, pioneer in bioinformatics.

De–Di 
Pierre Antoine Delalande (1787–1823), French naturalist employed by the National Museum of Natural History to collect natural history specimens
Max Delbrück (1906–1981), German-American physicist and biologist who demonstrated that natural selection acting on random mutations applied to bacteria, one of the creators of molecular biology; Nobel Prize 1969.
Richard Dell (1920–2002), New Zealand malacologist, author of The Archibenthal Mollusca of New Zealand
Stefano Delle Chiaje (1794–1860), Italian zoologist, botanist, anatomist and physician who worked on medicinal plants and on the taxonomy of invertebrates
Paul Émile de Puydt (1810–1888), Belgian botanist, author of Les Orchidées, histoire iconographique ..., active in political philosophy as well as botany
René Louiche Desfontaines (1750–1833), French botanist and ornithologist who collected many plants in Tunisia and Algeria
Gérard Paul Deshayes (1795–1875), French geologist and conchologist, distinguished for research on mollusc fossils 
Anselme Gaëtan Desmarest (1784–1838), French zoologist, author of Histoire Naturelle des Tangaras, des Manakins et des Todiers (natural history of various birds)
Ernst Dieffenbach (1811–1855), German naturalist, one of the first scientists to work in New Zealand
Johann Jacob Dillenius (1684–1747), German botanist who worked in England on rare plants and mosses
Lewis Weston Dillwyn (1778–1855), British botanist and conchologist, also active in porcelain manufacture and politics, author of The British Confervae, an illustrated study of British freshwater algae
John T. Dingle (active from 1959) British biologist and rheumatologist.
Joan Marjorie Dingley (1916–2008), New Zealand mycologist, world authority on fungi and New Zealand plant diseases
Zacharias Dische (1895–1988), Ukrainian-Jewish-American biochemist who discovered metabolic regulation by feedback inhibition
Malcolm Dixon (1899–1985), British biochemist, authority on enzyme structure, kinetics, and properties; author (with Edwin Webb) of Enzymes.

Do–Du 
Walter Dobrogosz (born 1933), American microbiologist, discoverer of Lactobacillus reuteri
Theodosius Dobzhansky (1900–1975), American geneticist of Ukrainian origin, one of the  leading evolutionary biologists of his time
Rembert Dodoens (1517–1585), Flemish botanist who classified plants according to  their properties and affinities (rather than listing them alphabetically)
Anton Dohrn (1840–1909), German marine biologist, Darwinist, founder of the world's first zoological research station, in Naples
David Don (1799–1841), British botanist who described major conifers discovered in his time, including the Coast Redwood.
George Don (1798–1856), British botanist known for his four-volume A General System of Gardening and Botany.
James Donn (1758–1813), English botanist, curator of the Cambridge University Botanic Gardens, and author of Hortus Cantabrigiensis
Jean Dorst (1924–2001), French ornithologist,  authority on bird migration and one of the writers of Le Peuple Migrateur (Winged Migration)
Edward Doubleday (1810–1849), British entomologist known for The Genera of Diurnal Lepidoptera
Henry Doubleday (1808–1875), British entomologist, author of the first catalogue of British butterflies and moths, Synonymic List of the British Lepidoptera
Jennifer Doudna (born 1964), American biochemist known for CRISPR-mediated genome editing; Nobel Prize 2020
David Douglas (1799–1834), Scottish botanist who studied conifers. The Douglas-fir is named after him.
Patricia Louise Dudley (1929–2004) American zoologist who studied copepods (small crustaceans)
Peter Duesberg (born 1936) German-American virologist who discovered the first retrovirus, and expert on genetic aspects of cancer, but his research contributions are overshadowed by his unpopular views on AIDS
Félix Dujardin (1802–1860), French zoologist who studied protozoans, and also the structure of the insect brain
Renato Dulbecco (1914–2012), Italian-American virologist awarded the Nobel Prize for work on oncoviruses
Ronald Duman (1954–2020), American neuroscientist whose work in biological psychiatry concerned the biological mechanisms behind antidepressants
André Marie Constant Duméril (1774–1860), French zoologist at the Muséum national d'histoire naturelle, who worked on herpetology and ichthyology
Auguste Duméril (1812–1870), French zoologist, professor of herpetology and ichthyology, noted for Catalogue méthodique de la collection des Reptiles
Charles Dumont de Sainte-Croix (1758–1830), French lawyer, but also an amateur ornithologist who described a number of Javanese bird species
Michel Felix Dunal (1789–1856), French botanist known for work on the genus Solanum
Robin Dunbar (born 1947), British anthropologist and evolutionary psychologist, a specialist in primate behaviour.
Gerald Durrell (1925–1995), British naturalist, writer, zookeeper, conservationist, and television presenter, writer of popular books, such as  My Family and Other Animals
Christian de Duve (1917–2013), Belgian cytologist and biochemist, discoverer of peroxisomes and lysosomes

E 
Sylvia Earle (born 1935), American oceanographer, author of Blue Hope: Exploring and Caring for Earth's Magnificent Ocean
Lindon Eaves (1944–2022), British geneticist (and priest) known for statistical modelling and the genetics of personality and social attitudes
John Carew Eccles (1903–1997), Australian neurophysiologist and winner of the 1963 Nobel Prize in Physiology or Medicine for his work on the synapse
Christian Friedrich Ecklon (1795–1868), Danish botanical collector, particularly of South African plants and apothecary
Gerald Edelman (1929–2014), American immunologist who discovered the structure of antibodies
Robert Stuart Edgar (1930– 2016), American geneticist who studied mechanisms of formation of virus particles 
John Tileston Edsall (1902–2002), American protein chemist at Harvard, author of Proteins, Amino Acids and Peptides 
George Edwards (1693–1773), British naturalist, ornithologist and illustrator, author of A Natural History of Uncommon Birds
Christian Gottfried Ehrenberg (1795–1876), German zoologist, comparative anatomist, geologist, and microscopist
Paul Ehrlich (1854–1915), German immunologist who discovered the first effective treatment for syphilis
Karl Eichwald (1795–1876), Baltic German geologist, physician, and naturalist, who described new species of reptiles
Theodor Eimer (1843–1898), German professor of zoology and comparative anatomy who studied speciation and kinship in butterflies
George Eliava (1892–1937), Georgian-Soviet microbiologist who worked with bacteriophages (viruses that infect bacteria)
Gertrude B. Elion (1918–1999), American pharmacologist known for using rational drug design for the discovery of new drugs
Daniel Giraud Elliot (1835–1915), American zoologist, founder of the American Ornithologist Union
Gladys Anderson Emerson (1903–1984), American historian and nutritionist, the first to isolate pure Vitamin E
Günther Enderlein (1872–1968), German zoologist, entomologist, microbiologist, physician and manufacturer of pharmaceutical products
Stephan Ladislaus Endlicher (1804–1849), Austrian botanist, numismatist and Sinologist, director of the Botanical Garden of Vienna
Michael S. Engel (born 1971), American paleontologist and entomologist who works on insect evolutionary biology and classification
George Engelmann (1809–1884), German-American botanist who described the flora of the west of North America
Adolf Engler (1844–1930), German botanist who worked on plant taxonomy and phytogeography, author of Die natürlichen Pflanzenfamilien
Johann Christian Polycarp Erxleben (1744–1777), German naturalist, author of Anfangsgründe der Naturlehre and Systema regni animalis, founder of the first academic veterinary school in Germany
Johann Friedrich von Eschscholtz (1793–1831), Baltic German biologist and explorer. The Latin name (Eschscholtzia californica) of the California poppy commemorates him
Constantin von Ettingshausen (1826–1897), Austrian botanist known for his palaeobotanical studies of flora from the Tertiary era
Alice Catherine Evans (1881–1975), American microbiologist who demonstrated that Bacillus abortus caused the disease brucellosis (undulant fever or Malta fever) in both cattle and humans
Warren Ewens (born 1937), Australian-American mathematical population geneticist working on the mathematical, statistical and theoretical aspects of population genetics
Thomas Campbell Eyton (1809–1880), English naturalist who studied cattle, fishes and birds, author of History of the Rarer British Birds

F

Fa–Fl
Jean Henri Fabre (1823–1915), French  teacher, physicist, chemist and botanist, best known for the study of insects
Johan Christian Fabricius (1745–1808), Danish entomologist who named nearly 10,000 species of animals, and established the basis of insect classification.
David Fairchild (1869–1954), American botanist who introduced many exotic plants into the USA
Hugh Falconer (1808–1865), Scottish geologist, botanist, palaeontologist, and paleoanthropologist who studied the flora, fauna, and geology of India, Assam, and Burma
John Farrah (1849–1907), English businessman and amateur biologist

Leonardo Fea (1852–1903), Italian zoologist who made large collections of insects and birds
Christoph Feldegg (1780–1845), Austrian naturalist who made a large collection of birds
David Fell (born 1947), British biochemist and pioneer of systems biology, author of Understanding the Control of Metabolism
Honor Fell (1900–1986), was a British zoologist who developed tissue and organ culture methods

Sérgio Ferreira (1934–2016), Brazilian pharmacologist who discovered bradykinin potentiating factor, important for anti-hypertension drugs
Alan Fersht (born 1943), British chemist and biochemist, expert on enzymes and protein folding
Harold John Finlay (1901–1951), New Zealand paleontologist and conchologist known for work on marine malacofauna of New Zealand
Otto Finsch (1839–1917), German ethnographer, naturalist and colonial explorer, known for a monograph on parrots
Edmond H. Fischer (1920–2021). Swiss-American biochemist known for protein kinases and phosphatases; Nobel Prize 1992
Johann Fischer von Waldheim (1771–1853), German entomologist known for the classification of invertebrates
Paul Henri Fischer (1835–1893), French physician, zoologist, malacologist and paleontologist
James Fisher (1922–1970), English author, editor, broadcaster, naturalist and ornithologist
Ronald Fisher (1890–1962), British biologist and statistician, one of the founders of population genetics
Leopold Fitzinger (1802–1884), Austrian zoologist known for classification of reptiles
Tim Flannery (born 1956), Australian biologist who has discovered numerous species of mammals
Alexander Fleming (1881–1955), British physician and microbiologist who discovered penicillin; Nobel Prize 1945
Charles Fleming (1916–1987), New Zealand ornithologist, palaeontologist
Walther Flemming (1843–1905), German physician and anatomist, discoverer of mitosis and chromosomes
Thomas Bainbrigge Fletcher (1878–1950), English officer in the Royal Navy, and an amateur lepidopterist who became an expert on microlepidoptera
Louis B. Flexner (1902–1996), American biochemist who worked on memory and brain function
Howard Walter Florey (1898–1968), Australian pharmacologist who was the co-inventor of penicillin; Nobel Prize 1945

Fo–Fu
Otto Folin (1867–1934), Swedish-American chemist who developed methods for analysing protein-free blood filtrates
E. B. Ford (1901–1988), British ecological geneticist who studied the genetics of natural populations, and invented the field of ecological genetics
Margot Forde (1935–1992), New Zealand botanist who studied plant taxonomies of Inner Mongolia, Xinjiang and the Caucasus
Peter Forsskål (1732–1763), Finnish explorer, orientalist, naturalist, and an apostle of Carl Linnaeus
Georg Forster (1754–1794), German naturalist, ethnologist, travel writer, journalist and revolutionary
Peter Forster (born 1967), German geneticist researching human origins and ancestry, and prehistoric languages 
Johann Reinhold Forster (1729–1798), German naturalist and ornithologist, the naturalist on James Cook's second Pacific voyage, 
Robert Fortune (1813–1880), Scottish botanist and plant hunter who introduced many ornamental plants to Britain, Australia and the USA
Dian Fossey (1932–1985), American zoologist, one of the world's foremost primatologists
Ruth Fowler Edwards (1930–2013), British geneticist who studied effects of sex hormones on pregnancy and embryonic mortality in mice
Heinz Fraenkel-Conrat (1910–1999), German-American biochemist and virologist who studied tobacco mosaic virus
Rosalind Franklin (1920–1958), British x-ray crystallographer whose contributed to the discovery of the structure of DNA
Francisco Freire Allemão e Cysneiro (1797–1874), Brazilian botanist who collected many Brazilian plants
Perry A. Frey (born 1935), American biochemist known for work on enzyme mechanisms
Irwin Fridovich (1929–2019), American biochemist who discovered and studied superoxide dismutase
Elias Magnus Fries (1794–1878), Swedish mycologist and botanist, one of the founders of modern mushroom taxonomy
Karl von Frisch (1886–1982), Austrian ethologist and Nobel laureate, best known for pioneering studies of bees
Imre Frivaldszky (1799–1870), Hungarian botanist who wrote on plants, snakes, snails and insects 
Joseph S. Fruton (1912–2007), Polish-American biochemist who worked on proteases, best known for his book General Biochemistry
Leonhart Fuchs (1501–1566), German physician and botanist, author of a book on medicinal plants 
José María de la Fuente Morales (1855–1932), Spanish priest and poet who studied insects and collected reptiles and amphibians
Louis Agassiz Fuertes (1874–1927), American ornithologist, illustrator and major American bird artist
Kazimierz Funk (1884–1967), Polish-American biochemist, discoverer of vitamin B3 (niacin).
Robert F. Furchgott (1916–2009), American biochemist known for discovering the biological roles of nitric oxide; Nobel Prize 1998

G

Ga–Gh 
Elmer L. Gaden (1923–2012), American biochemical engineer, the "father of biochemical engineering"
Joseph Gaertner (1732–1791), German botanist, author of De Fructibus et Seminibus Plantarum
François Gagnepain (1866–1952), French botanist who studied the Annonaceae
Joseph Paul Gaimard (1796–1858), French naval surgeon and naturalist
Biruté Galdikas (born 1946), Lithuanian-Canadian primatologist, expert on orangutans
Robert Gallo (born 1937), American virologist and co-discoverer of HIV
Francis Galton (1822–1911), British polymath, proponent of social Darwinism, eugenics and scientific racism
William Gambel (1823–1849), American naturalist, ornithologist, and botanist, the first to collect specimens in Santa Fe
Prosper Garnot (1794–1838), French surgeon and naturalist who collected specimens in South America
Charles Gaudichaud-Beaupré (1789–1854), French botanist on a circumglobal expedition in 1817–1820
Michael Gazzaniga (born 1939), American cognitive neuroscientist, best known for his research on split-brain patients
Patrick Geddes (1854–1932), Scottish biologist, sociologist, geographer and pioneering town planner
Howard Scott Gentry (1903–1993), American botanist, authority on agaves
John Gerard (1545–1611/12), English botanist, author of Herball, or Generall Historie of Plantes
Conrad von Gesner (1516–1565), Swiss physician, naturalist, bibliographer, and philologist, the father of modern scientific bibliography
Luca Ghini (1490–1566), Italian physician and botanist, creator of the first recorded herbarium and  the first botanical garden in Europe

Gi–Gm 
Clelia Giacobini (1931–2010), Italian microbiologist, a pioneer of microbiology applied to conservation-restoration
Quentin Gibson (1918–2011), British-American biochemist known for work on haem proteins
Walter Gilbert (born 1932). American biochemist awarded the Nobel Prize (1980) for work on DNA sequencing. 
John H. Gillespie (first publication 1973), American molecular evolutionist and population geneticist
Ernest Thomas Gilliard (1912–1965), American ornithologist on expeditions to South America and New Guinea.
Charles Henry Gimingham (1923–2018), British botanist who studied heathlands and heathers.
Charles Frédéric Girard (1822–1895), French biologist, ichthyologist, herpetologist
Johann Friedrich Gmelin (1748–1804), German naturalist who named many species of gastropods
Johann Georg Gmelin (1709–1755), German naturalist who travelled Siberia
Samuel Gottlieb Gmelin (1744–1774), German botanist who explored the rivers Don and Volga

Go–Gra 
Frederick DuCane Godman (1834–1919), English naturalist and ornithologist
Émil Goeldi (1859–1917), Swiss-Brazilian naturalist and zoologist
Johann Wolfgang von Goethe (1749–1832), German poet, novelist and  biologist who developed a theory of plant metamorphosis
Joseph L. Goldstein (born 1940), American biochemist awarded the Nobel Prize for studies of cholesterol
Eugene Goldwasser (1922–2010), American biochemist who  identified erythropoietin
Camillo Golgi (1843–1926), Italian physician and Nobel prize winner, pioneer in neurobiology
Jane Goodall (born 1934), British primatologist, ethologist and anthropologist who studied chimpanzee society
George Gordon (1806–1879), British botanist, expert on conifers
Philip Henry Gosse (1810–1888), English naturalist, originator of the Omphalos hypothesis, or "Last Thursdayism"
Michael M. Gottesman (born 1946), American biochemist who discovered of P-glycoprotein.
Augustus Addison Gould (1805–1866), American physician, conchologist and malacologist
John Gould (1804–1881), English ornithologist whose work on finches contributed to the theory of natural selection 
Stephen Jay Gould (1941–2002), American paleontologist and popular science writer
Alfred Grandidier (1836–1921), French naturalist and explorer, author of L'Histoire physique, naturelle et politique de Madagascar
Guillaume Grandidier (1873–1957) French geographer, ethnologist, zoologist who studied Madagascar
Temple Grandin (born 1947), American animal scientist, a designer of humane livestock facilities and writer on her experience with autism
Sam Granick (1909–1977), American biochemist known for studies of iron metabolism.
Chapman Grant (1887–1983), American herpetologist, historian, and publisher
Pierre-Paul Grassé (1895–1985), French zoologist, expert on termites and proponent of neo-Lamarckian evolution
Asa Gray (1810–1888), American botanist who argued that religion and science are not necessarily mutually exclusive
George Robert Gray (1808–1872), English zoologist, author of Genera of Birds 
John Edward Gray (1800–1875), English zoologist who described many species new to science
Andrew Jackson Grayson (1819–1869), American ornithologist and artist, author of Birds of the Pacific Slope

Gre–Gu 
David E. Green (1910–1983), American biochemist, pioneer in the study of enzymes involved in oxidative phosphorylation
William King Gregory (1876–1970), American zoologist, expert on mammalian dentition, contributor to evolutionary theory
Janet Grieve (born 1940), New Zealand biological oceanographer known for work on marine taxonomy and biological productivity
Frederick Griffith (1879–1941), British bacteriologist who studied the epidemiology and pathology of bacterial pneumonia
Jan Frederik Gronovius (1690–1762), Dutch botanist, patron of Linnaeus, author of Flora Virginica 
Pavel Grošelj (1883–1940), Slovene biologist who studied the nervous system of jellyfish
Colin Groves (1942–2017), British-Australian biologist and anthropologist, author of Primate Taxonomy
Félix Édouard Guérin-Méneville (1799–1874), French entomologist commemorated in the scientific names of dozens of genera and species
Johann Anton Güldenstädt (1745–1781), German naturalist and explorer who worked on the biology, geology, geography, and linguistics of the Caucasus
Allvar Gullstrand (1862–1930), Swedish ophthalmologist, awarded the Nobel Prize for work on the lens of the eye
Johann Ernst Gunnerus (1718–1773), Norwegian bishop and botanist, author of Flora Norvegica
Irwin Gunsalus (1912–2008), American biochemist who discovered lipoic acid, and coauthor of The Bacteria: A Treatise on Structure and Function
Albert Günther (1830–1914), British zoologist, ichthyologist and herpetologist who classified many reptile species
Herbert ("Freddie") Gutfreund (1921–2021), Austrian-British biochemist known for methods for studying fast enzyme-catalysed reactions

H

Ha 
Ernst Haeckel (1834–1919), German physician, zoologist, and evolutionist who argued that "ontogeny recapitulates phylogeny"
Hermann August Hagen (1817–1893), German entomologist  specialised in Neuroptera and Odonata
J. B. S. Haldane (1892–1964), British (later Indian) biologist known for work in physiology, genetics, evolutionary biology and mathematics; co-founder of population genetics
John Scott Haldane (1860–1936), Scottish physician and physiologist who made many important discoveries about the human body and the nature of gases 
William Donald Hamilton (1936–2000), British evolutionary biologist who provided a rigorous genetic basis to explain altruism
Philip Handler (1917–1981), American nutritionist and biochemist who discovered the tryptophan-nicotinic acid relationship.
Sylvanus Charles Thorp Hanley (1819–1899), British conchologist and malacologist
Arthur Harden (1865–1940), British biochemist who studied the fermentation of sugar and fermentative enzymes
Thomas Hardwicke (1755–1835), English soldier and naturalist who collected numerous specimens
Alister Clavering Hardy (1896–1985), English marine biologist and pioneer student of the biological basis of religion
Richard Harlan (1796–1843), American naturalist, zoologist, physicist and paleontologist, author of Fauna Americana and American Herpetology
Denham Harman (1916–2014), American biogerontologist, father of the free radical theory of aging
Ernst Hartert (1859–1933), German ornithologist who studied hummingbirds
Gustav Hartlaub (1814–1900), German physician and zoologist who studied exotic birds
Hamilton Hartridge (1886–1976), British eye physiologist who invented the continuous-flow method for fast reactions
Karl Theodor Hartweg (1812–1871), German botanist who collected plants from the Pacific region from Ecuador to California
Leland H. Hartwell (born 1939), American geneticist known for discoveries of proteins that control cell division
William Harvey (1578–1657), British physician who demonstrated the circulation of blood
William Henry Harvey (1811–1866), Irish botanist and phycologist who specialised in algae
Hans Hass (1919–2013), Austrian biologist and underwater diving pioneer who studied coral reefs, stingrays and sharks
Frederik Hasselquist (1722–1752), Swedish naturalist who collected specimens for Linnaeus in the Eastern Mediterranean
Arthur Hay (1824–1878), a Scottish soldier and ornithologist who collected  birds, insects, reptiles and mammals

He 
James Hector (1834–1907), Scottish geologist, naturalist, and surgeon
Charles Hedley (1862–1926), British-Australian naturalist, expert on molluscs
Reinhart Heinrich (1946–2006), German biophysicist who introduced and developed metabolic control analysis
Oskar Heinroth (1871–1945), German biologist who studied behaviour of ducks and geese, a founder of ethology
Edmund Heller (1875–1939), American zoologist and explorer who worked on mammals
Wilhelm Hemprich (1796–1825), German naturalist who studied the marine life of the Red Sea
Willi Hennig (1913–1976) German biologist who studied dipterans and created the theory of cladistics
Victor Henri (1872–1940), Russian-French physical chemist who applied ideas of physical chemistry to enzyme properties
John Stevens Henslow (1796–1861), English mineralogist, botanist and clergyman
Johann Hermann (1738–1800), French physician and naturalist who collected many mammals, birds, reptiles and fish
Albert William Herre (1868–1962), American ichthyologist and lichenologist known for taxonomic work in the Philippines
Alfred Hershey (1908–1997), American bacteriologist, Nobel Prizewinner for his work on virus genetics
Avram Hershko (born 1937). Hungarian-Israeli biochemist awarded the Nobel Prize for discovering ubiquitin-mediated protein degradation
Philip Hershkovitz (1909–1997), American mammalogist noted especially as a primatologist
Leo George Hertlein (1898–1972), American paleontologist who studied mollusks, echinoderms, and brachiopods

Hi–Ho 
Archibald Vivian Hill (1886–1977), British physiologist, winner of the 1922 Nobel Prize in Physiology or Medicine for elucidation of mechanical work in muscles
Robin Hill (1899–1991), British plant biochemist known for the Hill reaction of photosynthesis
Dorothy Hodgkin (1910–1994) British X-ray crystallographer, Nobel Prize in 1964 for work in protein crystallography.
Brian Houghton Hodgson (1800–1894), English naturalist who described many Himalayan birds and mammals
Jan van der Hoeven (1802–1868), Dutch zoologist who wrote about crocodiles butterflies, lancelets, lemurs and molluscs
Bruno Hofer (1861–1916), German fisheries scientist which studied fish parasitology and pathology
Johann Centurius Hoffmannsegg (1766–1849), German botanist, entomologist and ornithologist
Jacques Bernard Hombron (1798–1852), French naturalist and explorer who described Antarctic plants and animals
Leroy Hood (born 1938), American biochemist who developed high speed automated DNA sequencer
Robert Hooke (1635–1703), British natural philosopher and secretary to the Royal Society
Joseph Dalton Hooker (1817–1911), British botanist, explorer and director of Kew Botanic Gardens
William Jackson Hooker (1785–1865), British botanist, director of Kew Botanic Gardens
Frederick Gowland Hopkins (1861–1947), British biochemist awarded the Nobel Prize in 1929 for work on vitamins
John "Jack" Horner (born 1946), American paleontologist, specialized in dinosaurs
Norman Horowitz (1915– 2005), American geneticist who devised experiments to test whether life might exist on Mars
Thomas Horsfield (1773–1859), American naturalist who described Indonesian plants and animals
Bernardo Houssay (1887–1971), Argentine physiologist awarded the  Nobel Prize in 1947 for work on sugar metabolism
Martinus Houttuyn (1720–1798), Dutch naturalist who studied Pteridophytes, Bryophytes and Spermatophytes
Albert Howard (1873–1947), British botanist, expert on compost
Henry Eliot Howard (1873–1940), English ornithologist, who studied territorial behaviour in birds

Hr–Hy 
Sarah Blaffer Hrdy (born 1946), American anthropologist who works on evolutionary psychology and sociobiology
David H. Hubel (1926–2013), Canadian-American neurobiologist, awarded the Nobel Prize in 1981 for studies of the structure and function of the visual cortex.
François Huber (1750–1831), Swiss entomologist who specialized in honey bees
Ambrosius Hubrecht (1853–1915), Dutch zoologist whose major work was in embryology and placentation of mammals
William Henry Hudson (1841–1922), Argentinian-British ornithologist, advocate of Lamarckian evolution, critic of Darwinism and vitalist 
Alexander von Humboldt (1769–1859), German naturalist and explorer whose work on botanical geography laid the foundation for the field of biogeography
Allan Octavian Hume (1829–1912), British ornithologist who made a large collection of Indian birds
George Evelyn Hutchinson (1903–1991), British-American ecologist and limnologist who applied mathematics to ecology
Frederick Hutton (1835–1905), English biologist and geologist who used natural selection to explain the natural history of New Zealand
Hugh Huxley (1924–2013), British molecular biologist who worked on muscle physiology 
Julian Sorell Huxley (1887–1975), English zoologist and contributor to the modern evolutionary synthesis; first Director-General of UNESCO
Thomas Henry Huxley (1825–1895), English zoologist who clarified relationships between invertebrates
Alpheus Hyatt (1838–1902), American zoologist and palaeontologist, proponent of neo-Lamarckism
Libbie Hyman (1888–1969), American invertebrate zoologist, author of A Laboratory Manual for Elementary Zoology
Josef Hyrtl (1810–1894), Austrian anatomist, author of a well-known textbook of human anatomy

I
 Hermann von Ihering (1850–1930), German-Brazilian zoologist who collected specimens in Brazil to send to Germany
 Johann Karl Wilhelm Illiger (1775–1813), German zoologist and entomologist who overhauled the Linnaean system.
 Jan Ingenhousz (1730–1799), Dutch physiologist, biologist and chemist known for discovering photosynthesis
 Tom Iredale (1880–1972), English conchologist and ornithologist who published many systematic names
 Paul Erdmann Isert (1756–1789), German botanist who collected plant specimens from West Africa
 Harvey Itano (1920–2010), American biochemist who studied the molecular basis of sickle cell anaemia

J

 François Jacob (1920–2013), French biologist awarded the Nobel prize for studies of the regulation of transcription
 Nikolaus Joseph von Jacquin (1727–1817), Dutch-Austrian botanist, chemist and mineralogist who collected plants in the Caribbean region
 Honoré Jacquinot (1815–1887), French surgeon and zoologist who described and illustrated mollusc species
 Daniel H. Janzen (born 1939), American entomologist and ecologist who has catalogued the biodiversity of Costa Rica
 William Jardine (1800–1874), Scottish naturalist known for his book series The Naturalist's Library
 Feliks Pawel Jarocki (1790–1865), Polish zoologist, curator of a large zoological collection
 Alec Jeffreys (born 1950), British biochemist and geneticist who invented genetic fingerprinting
 William Jencks (1927–2007), American biochemist who applied chemical mechanisms to enzyme-catalysed reactions, author of Catalysis in Chemistry and Enzymology
 Thomas C. Jerdon (1811–1872), British physician, zoologist and botanist who described bird species of India. 
 John L. Jinks (1929–1897), British geneticist known for cytoplasmic inheritance
 Wilhelm Johannsen (1857–1927), Danish pharmacist, botanist, plant physiologist and geneticist who introduced the terms gene, phenotype and genotype
 Pauline Johnson, English immunologist and microbiologist concerned with innate and adaptive immune mechanisms 
 David Starr Jordan (1851–1931), ichthyologist and eugenicist, founding president of Stanford University
 Félix Pierre Jousseaume (1835–1921), French zoologist and malacologist who collected specimens from the Red Sea
 Mike Joy (born 1959), New Zealand freshwater ecologist and science communicator
 Thomas H. Jukes (1906–1999), British-American biologist known for work in nutrition and molecular evolution
 Adrien-Henri de Jussieu (1797–1853), French botanist, author of Cours élémentaire de botanique and Géographie botanique
 Antoine Laurent de Jussieu (1748–1836), botanist who classified flowering plants
 Bernard de Jussieu (1699–1777), French naturalist who classified the plants in the royal garden at Versailles
 Ernest Everett Just (1883–1941), American biologist, author of Basic Methods for Experiments on Eggs of Marine Animals

K

Ka–Ke

 Zbigniew Kabata (1924–2014), Polish specialist in fish parasitology, author of The Parasitic Copepoda of British Fishes
 Henrik Kacser (1918–1995), British geneticist and biochemist, founder of metabolic control analysis
 Emil T. Kaiser (1938–1988), Hungarian-American protein chemist known work on enzyme modification
 Pehr Kalm (1716–1779), Swedish-Finnish botanist who studied the life cycle of the 17-year periodical cicada
 Eric R. Kandel (born 1929), Austrian-American neuroscientist awarded the Nobel Prize for work on memory
Ferdinand Karsch (1853–1936), German arachnologist, entomologist, and anthropologist
 Gustav Karl Wilhelm Hermann Karsten (1817–1908), German botanist and traveller who named many plants
 Bernard Katz (1911–2003), German-British neuroscientist and biophysicist awarded the Nobel Prize for work on nerve biochemistry
 Rudolf Kaufmann (1909–c. 1941), German trilobitologist known for his contributions to allopatric speciation and punctuated equilibrium
 Stuart Kauffman (born 1939), American biologist widely known for his promotion of self-organization as a factor in producing the complexity of biological systems and organisms
 Johann Jakob Kaup (1803–1873), German naturalist who believed in an innate mathematical order in nature
 Janet Kear (1933–2004), English ornithologist who studied waterfowl 
 Douglas Kell (born 1953), British biochemist known for research on functional genomics
 John Kendrew (1917–1997), British x-ray crystallographer awarded the Nobel Prize for determining the crystal structure of myoglobin
 Gerald A. Kerkut (1927–2004), British zoologist and physiologist whose book The Implications of Evolution has been claimed to support creationism
 Anton Kerner von Marilaun (1831–1898), Austrian botanist who studied phytogeography and phytosociology
 Robert Kerr (1755–1813), Scottish surgeon who translated part of Linnaeus's Systema Naturae as The Animal Kingdom
 Warwick Estevam Kerr (1922–2018), Brazilian geneticist who studied bee genetics and introduced African bees to Brazil

Kh–Ku
 Har Gobind Khorana (1922–2011), Indian-American biochemist awarded the Nobel Prize for work on the genetic code.
 Zofia Kielan-Jaworowska (1925–2015), Polish paleontologist who led several paleontological expeditions to the Gobi desert
 Motoo Kimura (1924–1994), Japanese mathematical biologist, working in the field of theoretical population genetics
 Carolyn King (thesis 1971), New Zealand zoologist specialising in mammals, particularly small rodents and mustelids
 Norman Boyd Kinnear (1882–1957), Scottish zoologist involved in the drafting of the Protection of Birds Act of 1954
 William Kirby (1759–1850), English entomologist considered the "founder of entomology"
 Heinrich von Kittlitz (1799–1874), Prussian artist, naval officer, explorer and naturalist, collector of many specimens
 Aaron Klug (1926–2018), Lithuanian/South African/British crystallographer awarded the Nobel Prize for work on the structures of nucleic acid-protein complexes
 Jeremy Randall Knowles (1935–2008), British and American biochemist known for research on enzyme mechanisms
 Wilhelm Kobelt (1840–1916), German zoologist and malacologist, curator of the Senckenberg Museum
 Fritz Köberle (1910–1983), Austrian-Brazilian physician and pathologist, student of Chagas disease
 Karl Koch (1809–1879), German botanist who made botanical explorations in the Caucasus region
 Robert Koch (1843–1910), German Nobel Prize-winning physician and bacteriologist, who introduced Koch's postulates
 Emil Theodor Kocher (1841–1917), German physician awarded the Nobel Prize for his work on the thyroid gland
 Alexander Koenig (1858–1940), German naturalist who founded the Museum Koenig in Bonn
 Albert von Kölliker (1817–1905), Swiss physiologist who studied invertebrates, and later amphibians and mammalian embryos
 Charles Konig (1774–1851), German naturalist who described fossils in the British Museum
 Arthur Kornberg (1918–2007), American biochemist awarded the Nobel Prize for the discovery of DNA polymerase
 Roger D. Kornberg (born 1947), American biochemist at Stanford awarded the Nobel Prize for studies on RNA polymerase
 Adriaan Kortlandt (1918–2009), Dutch ethologist associated with the "Rift valley theory"
 Daniel E. Koshland Jr. (1920–2007) American biochemist known for protein flexibility (induced fit).
 Albrecht Kossel (1853–1927), German physician awarded the Nobel Prize for determining the chemical composition of nucleic acids
 Hans Adolf Krebs (1900–1981), German-British biochemist awarded the Nobel Prize for the discovery of the citric acid cycle
 Gerard Krefft (1830–1881), German-Australian zoologist and palaeontologist, authot of The Snakes of Australia
 Eduardo Krieger (born 1930), Brazilian physician and physiologist known for research on hypertension
 Kewal Krishan (born 1973), Indian biological anthropologist working in forensic anthropology
 Schack August Steenberg Krogh (1874–1949), Danish physiologist, awarded the Nobel Prize in Physiology or Medicine for studies of the mechanism of regulation of skeletal muscle capillaries
 Heinrich Kuhl (1797–1821), German zoologist who studied the fauna of Java

L

La
 Henri Laborit (1914–1995), French surgeon and physiologist who introduced the psychiatric use of chlorpromazine
 Bernard Germain de Lacépède (1756–1825), French naturalist who studied reptiles and fish
 David Lack (1910–1973), British ornithologist who introduced Lack's Principle to explain the evolution of avian clutch sizes
 Frédéric de Lafresnaye (1783–1861), French ornithologist who described new bird species
 Keith Laidler (1916–2003), British-Canadian expert on chemical and enzyme kinetics
 Jean-Baptiste Lamarck (1744–1829), French evolutionist, coined many terms like biology and fossils
 Aylmer Bourke Lambert (1761–1842), British botanist, author of A description of the genus Pinus
 Charles Lamberton (1876–1960), French paleontologist who specialized in the recently extinct subfossil lemurs
 Hildegard Lamfrom (1922–1984), German-American molecular biologist who developed a system for studying cell-free protein synthesis
 Hugh Lamprey (1928–1996), British ecologist and bush pilot who developed methods for estimating game densities in Africa
 Charles Francis Laseron (1887–1959), American-born Australian naturalist and malacologist
 John Latham (1740–1837), English naturalist who named many Australian birds, author of A General Synopsis of Birds
 Pierre André Latreille (1762–1833), French entomologist who studied arthropod systematics and taxonomy
 Charles Louis Alphonse Laveran (1845–1922), French physician awarded the Nobel Prize for discovering malaria is caused by a protozoon
 Barbara Lawrence (1909–1997), sometimes known as Barbara Lawrence Schevill, was an American paleozoologist and mammalogist
 George Newbold Lawrence (1806–1855), American ornithologist who conducted Pacific bird surveys
 Michel Lazdunski (born 1938) French neuroscientist known for work on ion channels

Le
William Elford Leach (1790–1836), English zoologist and marine biologist, an expert on crustaceans
Colin Leakey (1933–2018), British tropical botanist and specialist in bean science
Louis Leakey (1903–1972), Kenyan archaeologist and naturalist known for excavations in Olduvai Gorge
Mary Leakey (1913–1996), British paleoanthropologist who discovered the robust Zinjanthropus skull at Olduvai Gorge
Meave Leakey (born 1942), British paleontologist who discovered Kenyanthropus platyops
Richard Leakey (1944–2022), Kenyan paleontologist, archaeologist and conservationist who led an expedition to the Omo River, Ethiopia
Joseph LeConte (1823–1901), American physiologist who worked on monocular and binocular vision
Antoni van Leeuwenhoek (1632–1723), Dutch biologist, developer of the microscope
François Leguat (c. 1637–1735), French naturalist who described species of birds and tortoises endemic to Rodrigues
Albert L. Lehninger (1917–1986), American biochemist who discovered that oxidative phosphorylation in eukaryotes occurs in mitochondria
Joseph Leidy (1823–1891), American paleontologist, parasitologist and anatomist who worked on dinosaur fossils
Johann Philipp Achilles Leisler (1771–1813), German physician and naturalist who named many bird species
Luis Federico Leloir (1906–1987), Argentinian biochemist awarded the Nobel Prize for work on sugar nucleotides, carbohydrate metabolism, and renal hypertension
Juan Lembeye (1816–1889), Spanish ornithologist, author of Aves de la Isla de Cuba
Leonardo da Vinci (1452–1519), Italian (Florentine) artist, who, as an anatomist, dissected and illustrated many specimens
Jean Baptiste Leschenault de la Tour (1773–1826), French botanist and ornithologist who collected plant and bird specimens in Australia and Java
René-Primevère Lesson (1794–1849), French naturalist who described amphibian and reptile species
Charles Alexandre Lesueur (1778–1846), French naturalist, artist and explorer who described numerous turtle species
François Le Vaillant (1753–1824), French ornithologist who described  species of birds collected in Africa
Phoebus Levene (1869–1940), Russian-American biochemist who discovered that DNA was composed of nucleobases and phosphate
Michael Levitt (1947), South African-Israeli-British-American biophysicist awarded the Nobel Prize for developing multiscale models of complex chemical systems
Edward B. Lewis (1918–2004), American geneticist awarded the Nobel Prize for discovering the Drosophila Bithorax complex
Richard Lewontin (1929–2021), American evolutionary biologist, mathematician, geneticist, and social commentator

Li–Ly
Choh Hao Li (1913–1987) Chinese-American biochemist who discovered and synthesized human pituitary growth hormone
Wen-Hsiung Li (born 1942), Taiwanese molecular evolutionary biologist known fr studies of the molecular clock
Emmanuel Liais (1826–1900), French botanist who studied the plants of remote regions of Brazil
Martin Lichtenstein (1780–1867), German zoologist who described new species of amphibians and reptiles
Justus von Liebig (1803–1873), German chemist who contributed to agricultural and biological chemistry, one of the founders of organic chemistry.
John Lightfoot (1735–1788), English conchologist and botanist, author of Flora Scotica which deals with Scottish plants and fungi
David R. Lindberg (born 1948), American malacologist and biologist whose work has focused on sea snails
Aristid Lindenmayer (1925–1989), Hungarian biologist who developed a system to model the behaviour of plant cells
John Lindley (1799–1865), English botanist whose works included botanical textbooks for his students
Heinrich Friedrich Link (1767–1850), German botanist who studied many different subjects, including physics chemistry, geology, mineralogy, botany and zoology
Carl Linnaeus (1707–1778), Swedish botanist, father of the binomial nomenclature system
Fritz Lipmann (1899–1986), German-American biochemist awarded the Nobel Prize for work in intermediary metabolism
Jacques Loeb (1859–1924), German-American biologist who studied marine invertebrates and carried out an experiment on artificial parthenogenesis in sea urchins
Friedrich Loeffler (1852–1915), German bacteriologist who discovered the organisms causing diphtheria and foot-and-mouth disease
Konrad Lorenz (1903–1989), Austrian awarded the Nobel Prize for work in ethology
John Claudius Loudon (1783–1843), English botanist, author of An Encyclopædia of Gardening 
James Lovelock (1919–2022), English chemist and father of the Gaia hypothesis
Percy Lowe (1870–1948), English ornithologist who worked on fossil ostriches in China
Peter Wilhelm Lund (1801–1880), Danish zoologist and paleontologist who described pre-historic Pleistocene megafauna
Salvador Luria (1912–1991), Italian-American microbiologist awarded the Nobel prize winner for work on viruses
Adolfo Lutz (1855–1940), Brazilian epidemiologist, pathologist  who studied tropical medicine and medical zoology 
André Lwoff (1902–1994), French microbiologist awarded the Nobel for work on viral infection of bacteria
Marguerite Lwoff (1905–1979), French microbiologist and virologist who  worked on the taxonomy of ciliate protozoa
Richard Lydekker (1849–1915), English naturalist influential in the science of biogeography
Feodor Felix Konrad Lynen (1911–1979), German biochemist awarded the Nobel Prize for work on cholesterol and fatty acid metabolism 
Trofim Lysenko (1898–1976), Soviet biologist and agronomist whose denunciation of genetics was very damaging

M

Ma–Mc

Jules François Mabille (1831–1904), French malacologist who discovered and studied many mollusc species
William MacGillivray (1796–1852), Scottish botanist. and ornithologist, author A Manual of British Ornithology
John Macleod (1876–1935), British biochemist awarded the Nobel Prize for the discovery of insulin
Marcello Malpighi (1628–1694), Italian anatomist and biologist who described physiological features related to the excretory system
Ramon Margalef (1919–2004), Spanish ecologist who applied information theory and mathematical models
Emanuel Margoliash (1920–2008), Israeli-American biochemist whose work on cytochrome c sequences formed the starting point for studies of protein evolution
Leo Margolis (1927–1997), Canadian parasitologist which showed that parasites could be used to identify fish stocks
Lynn Margulis (1938–2011), American evolutionary theorist who proposed that organelles were "captured" bacteria
Othniel Charles Marsh (1831–1899), American paleontologist who collected Mesozoic reptiles, Cretaceous birds, and Mesozoic and Tertiary mammals
Barry Marshall (born 1951), Australian physician and microbiologist, awarded the 2005 Nobel Prize for elucidating the relationship between stomach ulcers and bacteria
Bruce Marshall (born 1948), New Zealand malacologist who has named many species and genera
Fermín Martín Piera (1954–2001), Spanish specialist in the systematics of Scarabaeoidea (beetles)
Carl Friedrich Philipp von Martius (1794–1868), German botanist and explorer who collected many specimens
John Martyn (1699–1768), English botanist, author of Historia Plantarum Rariorum
Thomas Martyn (1735–1825), English priest and botanist, author of Plantæ Cantabrigiensis and Flora Rustica
John Marwick (1891–1978), New Zealand palaeontologist and geologist who studied and classified mollusc fossils
Teresa Maryańska (1937–2019), Poland, paleontologist specializing in dinosaurs
Ruth Mason (1913–1990), New Zealand botanist specialising in the taxonomy and ecology of freshwater plants
Francis Masson (1741–1805), Scottish botanist and explorer, author of Stapeliae Novae, about South African succulents 
Gregory Mathews (1876–1949), Australian ornithologist whose papers dealt especially with taxonomy and nomenclature
Sara Branham Matthews (1888–1962), American microbiologist, listed under B (Branham).
Paul Matschie (1861–1926), German zoologist who described 11 new species of reptiles
William Diller Matthew (1871–1930), Canadian-American paleontologist who worked primarily on mammal fossils
Humberto Maturana (1928–2021), Chilean philosopher and biologist known in particular for autopoiesis
Polly Matzinger (born 1947), American immunologist known for  the idea that antigen-presenting cells respond to "danger signals" 
Carl Maximowicz (1827–1891), Russian botanist who studied flora of the Far East
Harold Maxwell-Lefroy (1877–1925), English entomologist who investigated the use of chemicals to control insects
Robert May (1936–2020), Australian mathematician who advanced the field of population biology by application of mathematical techniques
Ernst Mayr (1904–2005), ornithologist, systematist, philosopher of biology; originator of modern definition of "species"
Barbara McClintock (1902–1992), American biologist, winner of a Nobel Prize for her work on the transposon, or "jumping gene"
James V. McConnell (1925–1990), American biological psychologist who studied learning and memory transfer in planarians
Eileen McLaughlin (thesis 1993), New Zealand biologist who studies assisted reproduction
Mark McMenamin (born 1958), American paleontologist who has studied the Cambrian explosion and the Ediacaran biota
Bruce McEwen (1938–2020), American neuroendocrinologist and stress hormone expert

Me–Mi
Edmund Meade-Waldo (1855–1934), English ornithologist who discovered chick rearing behaviour of sandgrouse
Ilya Ilyich Mechnikov (1845–1916), Russian microbiologist awarded the Nobel Prize for work on the immune system and phagocytosis
Johann Wilhelm Meigen (1764–1845), German entomologist known for   pioneering work on Diptera.
Gregor Mendel (1822–1884), Austrian monk who is often called the "father of genetics" for his study of the inheritance of traits in pea plants
Édouard Ménétries (1802–1861), French entomologist, an authority on Lepidoptera and Coleoptera
Maud Leonora Menten (1879–1960), Canadian biochemist and histologist known for work on the kinetics of enzyme action
Archibald Menzies (1754–1852), Scottish naturalist who introduced Araucaria araucana ("monkey-puzzle tree") to England
Clinton Hart Merriam (1855–1942), American zoologist and ornithologist, author of Mammals of the Adirondacks
John C. Merriam (1869–1945), American paleontologist known for his taxonomy of vertebrate fossils at the La Brea Tar Pits 
Don Merton (1939–2011), New Zealand conservationist who saved the black robin from extinction, and also discovered the lek breeding system of the kakapo
Franz Meyen (1804–1840), Prussian physician and botanist, author of Phytotomie, the first major study of plant anatomy
Rodolphe Meyer de Schauensee (1901–1984), Swiss-American ornithologist noted for his study of South American birds
Otto Fritz Meyerhof (1884–1951), German-American physician and biochemist awarded the Nobel Prize for research on muscles
Leonor Michaelis (1875–1949), German biochemist known for work on enzyme kinetics, and on quinones
André Michaux (1746–1802), French botanist and explorer noted for his study of North American flora
Aleksandr Fyodorovich Middendorf (1815–1894), Russian zoologist who described the effects of permafrost on the spread of animals and plants
Nicholai Miklukho-Maklai (1846–1888), Russian marine biologist and anthropologist who studied indigenous people of New Guinea
Gerrit Smith Miller Jr. (1869–1956), American zoologist who concluded that the jaw of "Piltdown man" came from a fossil ape and the skullcap from a modern human
Jacques Miller (born 1931), French-Australian immunologist who discovered the function of the thymus
John Frederick Miller (1759–1796), English illustrator (primarily of botany)
Kenneth R. Miller (born 1948), American evolutionary biologist and author of Finding Darwin's God
Philip Miller (1691–1771), Scottish botanist,  author of The Gardener's and Florists Dictionary or a Complete System of Horticulture
Alphonse Milne-Edwards (1835–1900), French zoologist who studied fossil birds and deep-sea exploration
Henri Milne-Edwards (1800–1885), French zoologist known for work on crustaceans
César Milstein (1927–2002), Argentinian-British biochemist awarded the Nobel Prize for developing the use of monoclonal antibodies
Peter D. Mitchell (1920–1992), British biochemist awarded the Nobel Prize for the theory of chemiosmosis
George Jackson Mivart (1827–1900), English biologist, author of On the Genesis of Species

Mo-Mu
Hugo von Mohl (1805–1872), German botanist who first observed cell division under a microscope
Paul Möhring (1710–1792), German naturalist who pioneered the classification of bird species
Juan Ignacio Molina (1740–1829), Chilean naturalist, an early proponent of gradual evolution
Brian Molloy (1930–2022), New Zealand botanist, a leading authority on New Zealand orchids
Pérrine Moncrieff (1893–1979), New Zealand ornithologist, author of New Zealand birds and how to identify them
Jacques Monod (1910–1976), French geneticist and biochemist, awarded the Nobel Prize for discoveries concerning genetic control of enzyme and virus synthesis
George Montagu (1753–1815), English naturalist, author of Ornithological Dictionary
Luc Montagnier (1932–2022), French virologist, awarded the Nobel Prize for the discovery of HIV
Rita Levi-Montalcini (1909–2012), Italian-American neurologist awarded Nobel Prize for her co-discovery of growth factors
Tommaso di Maria Allery Monterosato (1841–1927), Italian malacologist who studied the fossil deposits of Mount Pellegrino
Pierre Dénys de Montfort (1766–1820), French naturalist who investigated the existence of gigantic octopuses
George Thomas Moore (1871–1956), American botanist who worked on plant pathology
Marianne V. Moore (active 1978–2017), American marine biologist
Alfred Moquin-Tandon (1804–1863), French naturalist, author of L'Histoire Naturelle des Iles Canaries
Otto Andreas Lowson Mörch (1828–1878), Swedish malacologist who described various taxa of molluscs
Thomas Hunt Morgan (1868–1945), American geneticist who worked on mutations in the fruit fly Drosophila
Mary Morgan-Richards (thesis 1985), New Zealand evolutionary biologist whose research focusses on topics such as speciation and hybridisation
Harold J. Morowitz (1927–2016), American biophysicist who studied the application of thermodynamics to living systems, including the origin of life 
Desmond Morris (born 1928), British zoologist and biologist, author of The Naked Ape
Roger Morse (1927–2000), American entomologist, expert on bees and beekeeping
Guy Mountfort (1905–2003), English ornithologist and conservationist, author of A Field Guide to the Birds of Britain and Europe
Ladislav Mucina (born 1956), Slovak botanist who works on plant ecology and biogeography
Ferdinand von Mueller (1825–1896), German-Australian physician, geographer, and botanist who collected and studied many Australian plants
John Muir (1838–1914), Scottish-American naturalist and conservationist who co-founded the Sierra Club 
Otto Friedrich Müller (1730–1784), Danish naturalist who studied worms and other invertebrates
Fritz Müller (1821–1897), German-Brazilian naturalist who studied the natural history of the Atlantic forest south of São Paulo
Hermann Müller (Thurgau) (1850–1927), Swiss botanist and oenologist who published on topics in viticulture and winemaking
Philipp Ludwig Statius Müller (1725–1776), German zoologist who classified the dugong, guanaco, potto and other species
Salomon Muller (1804–1864), Dutch naturalist and explorer who collected specimens in the Dutch East Indies
Kary Mullis (1944–2019), American biochemist, awarded Nobel Prize after inventing the polymerase chain reaction 
Otto von Münchhausen (1716–1774), German botanist who studied oaks in particular
John Murray (1841–1914), Scottish-Canadian marine biologist and oceanographer who collected marine species

N
Gary Paul Nabhan (born 1952), Lebanese-American conservationist, co-author of Forgotten Pollinators
David Nachmansohn (1899–1983), German biochemist who elucidated the role of phosphocreatine in muscular energy production
Carl Nägeli (1817–1891), Swiss botanist who studied cell division and pollination
Johann Friedrich Naumann (1780–1857), German founder of scientific ornithology, author of The Natural History of German Birds
John Needham (1713–1781), English priest and naturalist who claimed to have observed spontaneous generation
Joseph Needham (1900–1995), British biochemist, historian (of Chinese science) who studied embryology and morphogenesis
Christian Gottfried Daniel Nees von Esenbeck (1776–1858), German botanist and zoologist who described many plant species 
Masatoshi Nei (born 1931), Japanese-American evolutionary biologist and molecular population geneticist
Wendy Nelson (thesis 1980), New Zealand marine phycologist who studies seaweeds
Randolph M. Nesse (born 1948), American evolutionary biologist and psychiatrist who has studied aging 
Charles F. Newcombe (1851–1924), British botanist who studied the botany of North America 
Frank Newhook (1918–1999), New Zealand plant pathologist who studied fungal pathogens
Alfred Newton (1829–1907), English ornithologist, author of a four-volume Dictionary of Birds
Margaret Morse Nice (1883–1974), American ornithologist, author of Studies in the Life History of the Song Sparrow
Henry Alleyne Nicholson (1844–1899), British zoologist who studied fossil invertebrates
Hermann Niemeyer (1918–1991), Chilean biochemist and paediatrician known for work on mammalian metabolism
Marshall Warren Nirenberg (1927–2010), American biochemist and geneticist who took the first step in deciphering the genetic code
Elmer Noble (1909–2001), American parasitologist who described a pathogenic myxosporean
Alfred Merle Norman (1831–1918), English clergyman and naturalist who studied invertebrates
Alfred John North (1855–1917), Australian ornithologist who described many birds for the first time
Paul Nurse (born 1949), British geneticist awarded the Nobel Prize for work control of the cell cycle
Christiane Nüsslein-Volhard (born 1942), German biologist awarded the Nobel Prize for studies of genes involved in the development of fruit fly embryos
Thomas Nuttall (1786–1858), English botanist and zoologist, author of the Manual of the Ornithology of the United States and of Canada

O

Oc–Ok
Severo Ochoa (1905–1993), Spanish and American biochemist, Nobel Prize awarded the Nobel Prize for work on elucidating the genetic code
Eugene P. Odum (1913–2002), American ecologist, coauthor of Fundamentals of Ecology
Howard T. Odum (1924–2002), American ecologist who pioneered the field of systems ecology
William Ogilby (1808–1873), British zoologist concerned with classification and naming of animal species
William Robert Ogilvie-Grant (1863–1924), Scottish ornithologist who made many collecting trips, including Socotra and Madeira and the Canaries
Sergey Ognev (1886–1951), Russian zoologist who studied Russian mammals
Alexander George Ogston (1911–1996), British biochemist who explained how an achiral substance can have a chiral product in the tricarboxylate cycle
Tomoko Ohta (born 1933), Japanese molecular biologist who developed the nearly neutral theory of evolution
Reiji Okazaki (1930–1975), Japanese molecular biologist who discovered Okazaki fragments, important in DNA replication
Tsuneko Okazaki (born 1933). Japanese molecular biologist who discovered Okazaki fragments, important in DNA replication
Lorenz Oken (1779–1851), German naturalist who developed a classification of animals

Ol–Ow
Giuseppe Olivi (1769–1795), Italian naturalist who studied the fauna of the seabed
Mark A. O'Neill (born 1959), British biologist and computer scientist who has worked on artificial life and biologically inspired computing
Aleksandr Oparin (1894–1980), Russian biologist and biochemist, best known for his work on the origin of life
Alcide d'Orbigny (1802–1857), French naturalist who collected many specimens in South America
George Ord (1781–1866), American ornithologist, author of American Ornithology
Eleanor Anne Ormerod (1828–1901), English entomologist who developed agricultural entomology
Edward Latham Ormerod (1819–1873), English physician and entomologist, author of British Social Wasps 
Joan Oró (1923–2004), Spanish biochemist known for studies of the origin of life
Anders Sandøe Ørsted (1816–1872), Danish botanist who travelled in Central America and the Caribbean and published papers on the flora
Henry Fairfield Osborn (1857–1935), American eugenicist who led many fossil-hunting expeditions to the American Southwest
William Charles Osman Hill (1901–1975), British anatomist, primatologist and expert on primate anatomy
Halszka Osmólska (1930–2008), Polish paleontologist specializing in dinosaurs
Emile Oustalet (1844–1905), French zoologist who studied birds in particular
Ray D. Owen (1915–2014), American immunologist whose work led to modern immunology and organ transplantation
Richard Owen (1804–1892), British biologist, paleontologist, and taxonomist of fossil and extant organisms

P

Pa–Pe
George Emil Palade (1912–2008), Romanian-American biologist who discovered ribosomes, awarded the Nobel Prize for innovations in electron microscopy and cell fractionation
Paul Maurice Pallary (1869–1942), French-Algerian malacologist who named many mollusc species
Peter Simon Pallas (1741–1811), Prussian zoologist who described numerous animal species 
Edward Palmer (1829–1911), British botanist who collected American plants for the Smithsonian Institution 
Josif Pančić (1814–1888), Serbian botanist who documented the flora of Serbia
Paracelsus (Theophrastus von Hohenheim) (1493–1541), Swiss physician and alchemist who pioneered toxicology
Pia Parolin (born 1964), Italian biologist and tropical ecologist, photographer, author
Carl Parrot (1867–1911), German gynaecologist and ornithologist interested in the distribution and migration of birds
Louis Pasteur (1822–1895), French biologist, microbiologist, and chemist who established principles of vaccination
William Paterson (1755–1810), British soldier, botanist and explorer who collected botanical, geological and insect specimens in Australia
David J. Patterson (born 1950) (Belfast) British then Irish biologist, studied protist taxonomy and evolution, later biodiversity informatics, Zoological Society of London, Silver medal
Robert Patterson (1802–1872), Irish naturalist, author of The natural history of the insects mentioned in Shakespeare's plays
Daniel Pauly (born 1946), French marine biologist who has developed techniques to estimate the growth and mortality of fishes
Ivan Pavlov (1849–1936), Russian physiologist, psychologist and physician who discovered conditioning, and awarded the Nobel Prize for work on the digestive system
Titian Peale (1799–1885), American ornithologist, entomologist, photographer, and explorer
Louise Pearce (1885–1959), American pathologist who helped develop a treatment for African sleeping sickness
Donald C. Peattie (1898–1964), American botanist, author of A Natural History of Western Trees
Eva J. Pell (born 1948), American plant pathologist who studies the physiological and biochemical impact of air pollutants
Paul Pelseneer (1863–1945), Belgian zoologist, primarily a malacologist, but interested in all aspects of zoology
Jean-Marie Pelt (1933–2015), French botanist who studied medicinal plants, of Afghanistan, Chile, Europe, and Yemen
Thomas Pennant (1726–1798), Welsh naturalist and antiquary, author of History of Quadrupeds
David Penny (born 1939), New Zealand biologist known for theoretical biology, molecular evolution, human evolution, and the history of science
Henri Perrier de la Bâthie (1873–1958), French botanist who studied the plants of Madagascar.
George Perry (born 1771), English naturalist, author of Conchology, or the natural history of shells
Samuel Victor Perry (1918–2009) British biochemist, pioneer in muscle biochemistry
Christian Hendrik Persoon (1761–1836), German mycologist who wrote extensively on fungi
Wilhelm Peters (1815–1883), German naturalist who described the mammals, birds, reptiles, amphibians, river fish, insects and botany of Mozambique

Pf–Pu
Ludwig Karl Georg Pfeiffer (1805–1877), German physician, botanist and conchologist who named more than 20 new genera and species
Rodolfo Amando Philippi (1808–1904), German-Chilean zoologist who described three new species of South American lizards
Constantine John Phipps (1744–1792), English explorer, the first modern European to describe the polar bear and the ivory gull
David Andrew Phoenix (born 1966), British biochemist who studies properties of biologically active amphiphilic peptides.
Frederick Octavius Pickard-Cambridge (1860–1905), English entomologist, expert on spiders
Octavius Pickard-Cambridge (1828–1917), English entomologist, mainly interested in spiders, but also on birds, butterflies and moths
Charles Pickering (1805–1878), American naturalist, author of Races of Man and Their Geographical Distribution
Henry Augustus Pilsbry (1862–1957), American zoologist, malacologist, leader in invertebrate taxonomy
Gregory Goodwin Pincus (1903–1967), American biologist and co-inventor of the combined oral contraceptive pill
Ronald Plasterk (born 1957), Dutch politician and molecular biologist who has worked on zebrafish development 
Pliny the Elder (23–79), Roman natural philosopher, author of Naturalis Historia an encyclopedia, a model of later ones
Reginald Innes Pocock (1863–1947), British taxonomist, expert on spiders and millipedes
Felipe Poey (1799–1891), Cuban zoologist who worked on butterflies and fish
Giuseppe Saverio Poli (1746–1825), Italian physicist and zoologist, whose collection included, especially, Lepidoptera, Cnidaria and Mollusca
Winston Ponder (born 1941), New Zealand malacologist who has described many marine and freshwater animals, especially micromolluscs
Arthur William Baden Powell (1901–1987), New Zealand malacologist and paleontologist who studied and classified New Zealand molluscs
Thomas Littleton Powys (1833–1896), English ornithologist, author of Notes on the Birds of Northamptonshire and Neighbourhood
Karel Presl (1794–1852), Bohemian botanist, authority on Czech flora
Alice Pruvot-Fol (1873–1972), French malacologist who described many new species, mostly on the basis of preserved animals
Nikolai Przhevalsky (1839–1888), Russian explorer who described some previously unknown animal species, including Przewalski's horse
Jan Evangelista Purkyně (1787–1869), Czech anatomist and physiologist who discovered the discovered the Purkinje effect and introduced the term protoplasm
Frederick Traugott Pursh (1774–1820), German-American botanist who studied the plants collected on the Lewis and Clark Expedition
Frank W. Putnam (1917–2006), American biochemist who worked on the structure and function of blood proteins
Paul Émile de Puydt (1810–1888), Belgian botanist, interested in particular in orchids

Q
Juda Hirsch Quastel(1899–1987). British-Canadian biochemist known for research in neurochemistry, metabolism and cancer
Jean Louis Armand de Quatrefages de Bréau (1810–1892), French naturalist whose work ranged from the annelids to man.
Jean René Constant Quoy (1790–1869), French zoologist who studied the origins of coral reefs

R

Ra
George Radda (born 1936), Hungarian chemist, known for molecular imaging of heart metabolism
Gustav Radde (1831–1903), German naturalist and explorer whose work encompassed birds, amphibians, reptiles, lizards, snakes and insects
Thomas Stamford Raffles (1781–1826), British biologist who studied mammals, fish, birds and insects
Constantine Samuel Rafinesque (1783–1840), French zoologist and botanist who described many North American species
Émile Louis Ragonot (1843–1895), French entomologist who named many genera of butterflies and moths
Santiago Ramón y Cajal (1852–1934), Spanish histologist awarded the Nobel prize for work on neuroanatomy and the central nervous system
Edward Pierson Ramsay (1842–1916), Australian ornithologist, author of Catalogue of the Australian Birds in the Australian Museum at Sydney
Austin L. Rand (1905–1982), Canadian zoologist who studied birds of Madagascar and New Guinea
Suresh Rattan (born 1955), Indian biogerontologist who has formulated the concepts of essential lifespan and virtual gerontogenes
John Ray (1627–1705), English naturalist whose classification of plants Historia Plantarum was a step towards modern taxonomy

Re
Francesco Redi (1626–1697), Italian physician known for his experiment in 1668 which is regarded as one of the first steps in refuting abiogenesis
Lovell Augustus Reeve (1814–1865), English conchologist, author of many publications on mollusc shells
Heinrich Gustav Reichenbach (1823–1889), German orchidologist, the world's leading authority on orchids
Ludwig Reichenbach (1793–1879), German botanist and ornithologist who introduced the idea of displaying invertebrate creatures as glass models
Anton Reichenow (1847–1941), German ornithologist known for classifying birds in six groups
Caspar Georg Carl Reinwardt (1773–1854), Dutch botanist who studied amphibians and reptiles as well as plants
Bernhard Rensch (1900–1990), German evolutionary biologist who searched for universal rules, such as Allen's Rule, Gloger's Rule and Rensch's rule
Ralf Reski (born 1958), German botanist and biotechnologist who developed Physcomitrella as model organism

Ri
Achille Richard  (1794–1852), French botanist who studied and described several genera of orchids 
Jean Michel Claude Richard (1787–1868), French botanist and plant collector
Louis Claude Richard (1754–1821), French botanist who collected botanical specimens in the Caribbean region
Olivier Jules Richard (1836–1896), French lichenologist who worked on the anatomy and symbiosis of lichens.
John Richardson (1787–1865), Scottish naturalist who explored the Arctic region
Charles Richet (1850–1935), French physiologist awarded the Nobel Prize for his discovery of anaphylaxis
Charles Wallace Richmond (1868–1932), American ornithologist, compiler of the Richmond Index of Latin names of birds 
Robert Ridgway (1850–1929), American ornithologist, author of The Birds of North and Middle America
Henry Nicholas Ridley (1855–1956), British botanist who promoted rubber as a commercial product
Christina Riesselman (thesis 2011), American paleoceanographer whose research focus is on Southern Ocean response to changing climate

Ro–Ru
Austin Roberts (1883–1948), South African zoologist, posthumous author of The mammals of South Africa
Harold E. Robinson (1932–2020), American botanist and entomologist who worked on sunflowers and the bryophytes
Maurício Rocha e Silva (1910–1983), Brazilian physician and pharmacologist, codiscoverer of bradykinin
Martin Rodbell (1925–1998), American biochemist and molecular endocrinologist awarded the Nobel Prize for work on signal transduction in cells
George Romanes (1848–1894), Scottish-Canadian evolutionary biologist and physiologist who laid the foundation of comparative psychology
Alfred Romer (1894–1973), American paleontologist whose textbook Vertebrate Paleontology laid the foundation for classifying  vertebrates
Robert Rosen (1934–1998), American theoretical biologist who studied the defining principles of life
Joel Rosenbaum (born 1933), American cell biologist who studies cilia and flagella in the model species Chlamydomonas
Harald Rosenthal (born 1937), German hydrobiologist known for his work in fish farming and ecology
Miriam Louisa Rothschild (1908–2005), British entomologist, an authority on fleas, and the first person to work out the flea's jumping mechanism
Walter Rothschild (1868–1937), British zoologist interested in the taxonomy of birds and butterflies
Joan Roughgarden (born 1946), American ecologist, evolutionary biologist and philosopher of science
William Roxburgh (1759–1815), Scottish botanist who studied sugarcane, indigo and sago
Adriaan van Royen (1704–1779), Dutch botanist known for work on the flora of Southeast Asia
Karl Rudolphi (1771–1832), Swedish-German physiologist regarded as the father of helminthology
Eduard Rüppell (1794–1884), German naturalist and explorer, the first naturalist to traverse Ethiopia

S

Sa
Joseph Sabine (1770–1837), English naturalist, authority on the moulting, migration, and habit of British birds
Julius von Sachs (1832–1897), German botanist who first demonstrated hydroponics
Frederick Sanger (1918–2013), British biochemist twice awarded the Nobel Prize, for protein sequencing and for nucleic acid sequencing
Étienne Geoffroy Saint-Hilaire (1772–1844), French naturalist who established the principle of unity of composition
Isidore Geoffroy Saint-Hilaire (1805–1861), French zoologist who coined the term éthologie (ethology), authority on deviation from normal structure
Carl Ulisses von Salis-Marschlins (1762–1818), Swiss naturalist interested in botany, entomology, and conchology
Edward James Salisbury (1886–1978), British botanist with "notable contributions to plant ecology and to the study of the British flora generally"
Richard Anthony Salisbury (1761–1829), British botanist, shunned by many botanists of his day 
Jonas Salk (1914–1995), American biologist developed one of the first successful polio vaccines
Robert Sapolsky (born 1957), American neuroscientist who studies sources of stress in wild baboons 
Georg Ossian Sars (1837–1927), Norwegian marine biologist who studied the eggs and larvae of fish
Michael Sars (1809–1869), Norwegian taxonomist who described life-histories and reproductive cycles, behaviour and geographical dispersal of fish
Konstantin Satunin (1863–1915), Russian zoologist who described mammals of Russia and Central Asia
William Saunders (1822–1900), American botanist responsible for introducing many fruits and vegetables to American agriculture
Marie Jules César Savigny (1777–1851), French zoologist who wrote about the fauna in the Mediterranean Sea and the Red Sea
Thomas Say (1787–1843), American naturalist, the father of American descriptive entomology and American conchology

Sc
George Schaller (born 1933), American zoologist, one of the preeminent field biologists of the 20th century
Albert Schatz (1920–2005), American microbiologist who discovered streptomycin
Paul Schimmel (born 1940) American biochemist who developed nucleic acid sequencing and coauthored Biophysical Chemistry
Friedrich Schlechter (1872–1925), German taxonomist and botanist, author of several works on orchids
Hermann Schlegel (1804–1884), German ornithologist, herpetologist and ichthyologist who believed that species are fixed
Matthias Jakob Schleiden (1804–1881), German botanist and co-founder of the cell theory
George Schoener (1864–1941), German-American botanist who experimented on rose breeding, especially in the use of wild species
Rudolph Schoenheimer (1898–1941), German-American biochemist, pioneer of radioactive tagging of molecules
Johann David Schoepf (1752–1800), German botanist and zoologist who studied turtles
Heinrich Wilhelm Schott (1794–1865), German botanist who studied plants of the arum family
Johann Christian Daniel von Schreber (1739–1810), German naturalist who wrote a series of books that focused on the mammals of the world
Leopold von Schrenck (1826–1894), Russian zoologist, geographer and ethnographer who studied the native peoples of Russia
Charles Schuchert (1858–1942), American invertebrate paleontologist, a leader in the development of paleogeography
Stefan Schuster (born 1961) German biophysicist, pioneer in metabolic control analysis and metabolic pathway analysis
Theodor Schwann (1810–1882), German physician and physiologist whose major contribution to biology was the extension of cell theory to animals
Neena Schwartz (1926–2018), American endocrinologist  known for her work on female reproductive biology
Georg August Schweinfurth (1836–1925), Baltic German botanist and ethnologist who explored East Central Africa
Philip Sclater (1829–1913), English zoologist and ornithologist who identified the main zoogeographic regions of the world.
Giovanni Antonio Scopoli (1723–1788), Italian-Austrian naturalist who collected plants and insects in the Alps

Se–Sl
Henry Seebohm (1832–1895), English ornithologist and traveller, author of A History of British Birds
Michael Sela (1924–2022) Israeli immunologist who works on synthetic antigens, molecules that trigger the immune system
Prideaux John Selby (1788–1867), English botanist and ornithologist, best known for his Illustrations of British Ornithology
Nikolai Alekseevich Severtzov (1827–1885), Russian explorer and naturalist, author of Vertical and Horizontal Distribution of Turkestan Wildlife
Richard Bowdler Sharpe (1847–1909), English zoologist and ornithologist who described many new species of bird
George Shaw (1751–1813), English botanist and zoologist who published English descriptions with scientific names of several Australian animals in Zoology of New Holland
George Ernest Shelley (1840–1910), English ornithologist, author of The Birds of Africa
Charles Scott Sherrington (1857–1922), British physiologist and neuroscientist, awarded the Nobel Prize for work on the functions of neurons
Philipp Franz von Siebold (1796–1866), German botanist who studied Japanese flora and fauna, and introduced Western medicine to Japan
George Gaylord Simpson (1902–1984), American paleontologist participated in the modern synthesis, and wrote Tempo and Mode in Evolution
Rolf Singer (1906–1994), German-born mycologist, taxonomist of gilled mushrooms (agarics)

Sm–So
John Kunkel Small (1869–1938), American botanist who documented the flora of Florida
Andrew Smith (1797–1872), Scottish surgeon, explorer, ethnologist and zoologist, author of Illustrations of the Zoology of South Africa
Edgar Albert Smith (1847–1916), British zoologist and malacologist who published many separate memoirs on the Mollusca
Emil L. Smith (1911–2009) American protein chemist known for studies of protein evolution
Frederick Smith (1805–1879), British entomologist who specialized on Hymenoptera
James Edward Smith (1759–1828), English botanist, founder and first President of the Linnean Society of London
Johannes Jacobus Smith (1867–1947), Dutch botanist who  collected specimens of plants of the Dutch East Indies as well as describing and cataloguing their flora
James Leonard Brierley Smith (1897–1968), South African ichthyologist who identified a taxidermied fish as a coelacanth
John Maynard Smith (1920–2004), British theoretical and mathematical evolutionary biologist and geneticist who discussed the evolution of sex and signalling theory, as well as other fundamental problems
Oliver Smithies (1925–2017) British-American geneticist and physical biochemist awarded the Nobel Prize for gel electrophoresis
John Otterbein Snyder (1867–1943), American ichthyologist who documented the native fishes of San Francisco Bay
Solomon H. Snyder (born 1938), American neuroscientist who co-discovered endorphins
Daniel Solander (1733–1782), Swedish botanist who described and catalogued many plants of Australia and New Zealand
Alberto Sols (1917–1989), Spanish biochemist known for studies of metabolic regulation and for rejuvenating biochemistry in Spain
Louis François Auguste Souleyet (1811–1852), French zoologist and malacologist who studied marine molluscs of the Pacific

Sp
Douglas Spalding (1841–1877), English biologist who researched on animal behavior and discovered imprinting
Lazzaro Spallanzani (1729–1799), Italian biologist whose research on biogenesis paved the way for the downfall of the theory of spontaneous generation
Anders Sparrman (1748–1820), Swedish naturalist, author of A voyage to the Cape of Good Hope, towards...
Walter Baldwin Spencer (1860–1929), British-Australian evolutionary biologist and anthropologist, known for fieldwork with Aboriginal peoples in Central Australia
Roger W. Sperry (1913–1994), American neuropsychologist awarded the Nobel Prize for his split-brain research
Maximilian Spinola (1780–1857), Italian entomologist who described many taxa
Johann Baptist von Spix (1781–1826), German naturalist who made a comparative morphology of the skulls of primates, reptiles, birds and others
Herman Spöring (1733–1771), Finnish explorer, draughtsman, botanist and naturalist, who collected specimens from the south Pacific
Kurt Sprengel (1766–1833), German physician and botanist who studied the history of medicine
Stewart Springer (1906–1991), American ichthyologist noted for shark classification, behavior and distribution of species
Richard Spruce (1817–1893), English botanist and explorer who collected plants in South America

Sta–Ste
Agustín Stahl (1842–1917), Puerto Rican zoologist and botanist who studied the plants of Puerto Rico
Franklin Stahl (born 1929), American molecular biologist and geneticist who participated in the experiment to show semiconservative DNA replication
Edward Stanley (1775–1851), English naturalist with a large collection of living animals
Philipp Ludwig Statius Müller (1725–1776), German zoologist who classified the dugong, guanaco, potto and other species
G. Ledyard Stebbins (1906–2000),  American botanist and geneticist, one of the leading evolutionary biologists of the 20th century.
Japetus Steenstrup (1813–1897), Danish zoologist who discovered the possibility of using fossils to interpreting climate and vegetation changes
Charles M. Steinberg (1932–1999), American immunobiologist and geneticist, co-discoverer of the amber-mutants that led to the recognition of stop codons
Franz Steindachner (1834–1919), Austrian ichthyologist and herpetologist who published work on fishes, reptiles and amphibians
Joan Steitz (born 1941), American biochemist known for work on RNA
Thomas A. Steitz (1940–2018), American biochemist awarded the Nobel Prize for pioneering work on the ribosome
Leonhard Hess Stejneger (1851–1943), Norwegian-American ornithologist, herpetologist and zoologist known for work on reptiles and amphibians
Georg Wilhelm Steller (1709–1746), German ornithologist who worked in Russia, a pioneer of Alaskan natural history
James Francis Stephens (1792–1853), English entomologist and naturalist, author of Manual of British Beetles
Kaspar Maria von Sternberg (1761–1838), Bohemian botanist, the "Father of Paleobotany"
Karl Stetter (born 1941), German  microbiologist, expert on microbial life at high temperatures
Nettie Maria Stevens (1861–1912), American who discovered sex chromosomes, after observing sperm from male mealworms
Frederick Campion Steward (1904–1993), British botanist, pioneer of plant tissue culture, genetic engineering and plant biotechnology

Sti–Stu
Edward Charles Stirling (1848–1919), Australian anthropologist who reconstructed the skeleton of an enormous marsupial
Gerald Stokell (1890–1972), New Zealand horticulturist and ichthyologist who described native fish
Witmer Stone (1866–1939), American ornithologist, botanist, and mammalogist, author of The Plants of Southern New Jersey
Gottlieb Conrad Christian Storr (1749–1821), German physician, chemist and naturalist, the taxonomic authority of the genus Mellivora
Vida Stout (1930–2012), New Zealand limnologist whose research focused on the biology and chemistry of South Island lakes
Eduard Strasburger (1844–1912), German botanist who proposed that new cell nuclei only arise from the division of other nuclei
Erwin Stresemann (1889–1972), German ornithologist who compiled a comprehensive account of avian biology
John Struthers (1823–1899), Scottish anatomist known for the ligament of Struthers, a rare character in humans
Alfred Henry Sturtevant (1891–1970), American geneticist who constructed the first genetic map of a chromosome
Samuel Stutchbury (1798–1859), English naturalist and geologist co-discoverer of Thecodontosaurus, the fourth dinosaur genus to be named
Lubert Stryer (born 1938), American biophysicist who developed the use of fluorescence spectroscopy, best known for his textbook Biochemistry

Su–Sz
Richard Summerbell (born 1956), Canadian mycologist whose research explores opportunistic fungal pathogens
Carl Jakob Sundevall (1801–1875), Swedish zoologist who developed a phylogeny for birds based on the muscles of the hip and leg
Mriganka Sur (born 1953), Indian cognitive neuroscientist specializing in neuroplasticity
Henry Suter (1841–1918), Swiss-New Zealand zoologist, naturalist and palaeontologist who studied the terrestrial and freshwater molluscs of New Zealand
Mary Sutherland (1893–1955), New Zealand botanist who pioneered work in agricultural forestry
William John Swainson (1789–1855), English ornithologist, malacologist, conchologist, entomologist and artist
Jan Swammerdam (1637–1680), Dutch biologist and microscopist who showed that the egg, larva, pupa, and adult of an insect are different forms of the same animal
Olof Swartz (1760–1816), Swedish botanist known for his taxonomic work and studies of pteridophytes
Robert Swinhoe (1836–1877), English naturalist who  catalogued many Southeast Asian birds
William Henry Sykes (1790–1872), British ornithologist who catalogued birds and mammals from the Deccan
Albert Szent-Györgyi (1893–1986), Hungarian biochemist, the first to isolate vitamin C, awarded the Nobel Prize for analysis of the tricarboxylate cycle

T

Ta–Ti
Władysław Taczanowski (1819–1890), Polish zoologist who mainly worked on ornithology but also described reptiles, arachnids and other taxa
Armen Takhtajan (1910–2009), Armenian botanist who worked on plant evolution, systematics and biogeography
Charles Tanford (1921–2009), American protein chemist known for analysis of the hydrophobic effect
Diana Temple (1925–2006), Australian pharmacologist known for work on respiratory pharmacology
Peter Gustaf Tengmalm (1754–1803), Swedish physician and naturalist who worked on both medicine and ornithology
Coenraad Jacob Temminck (1778–1858), Dutch zoologist whose Manuel d'ornithologie was the standard work on European birds for many years
Theophrastus (372 BC – 287 BC), biologist and the successor of Aristotle in the Peripatetic school, popularizer of science
Johannes Thiele (1860–1935), German zoologist and malacologist whose classification of Gastropoda remained in use for many years
Mason Blanchard Thomas (1866–1912), American phytopathologist and botanist, coauthor of A laboratory manual of plant histology
Michael Rogers Oldfield Thomas (1858–1929), British zoologist whose work on mammals, led to the description of many new species
D'Arcy Wentworth Thompson (1860–1942), Scottish biologist, author of On Growth and Form
William Thompson (1805–1852), Irish ornithologist and naturalist who published numerous notes on many aspects of birds
Charles Wyville Thomson (1832–1882), Scottish marine biologist who studied the biological conditions of the deep seas 
Louis-Marie Aubert du Petit-Thouars (1758–1831), French botanist known for his work on orchids from Madagascar, Mauritius and Réunion
Carl Peter Thunberg (1743–1828), Swedish naturalist who collected and described plants and animals from southern Africa and Asia
Samuel Tickell (1811–1875), British ornithologist who  contributed to the ornithology and mammalology of India
Niko Tinbergen (1907–1988), Dutch ethologist awarded the Nobel Prize for work on organization and social behavior patterns of animals
Ignacio Tinoco Jr. (1930–2016), American chemist known for pioneering work on RNA folding
Arne Tiselius (1902–1971), Swedish biochemist awarded the Nobel Prize for development of protein electrophoresis.

To–Tu
Agostino Todaro (1818–1892), Italian botanist who described Sicilian plants
Susumu Tonegawa (born 1939), Japanese biologist, awarded the Nobel Prize discovery of the genetic principle for generation of antibody diversity, later primarily interested in neuroscience
John Torrey (1796–1873), American botanist who described plants of the USA 
Joseph Pitton de Tournefort (1656–1708), French botanist, the first to make a clear definition of the concept of genus for plants
John Kirk Townsend (1809–1851), American ornithologist who collected animal specimens for John James Audubon
Thomas Stewart Traill (1781–1862), Scottish doctor and naturalist, specialist in medical jurisprudence
Abraham Trembley (1710–1784), Swiss naturalist, known for being the first to study freshwater polyps
Melchior Treub (1851–1910), Dutch botanist who worked on plants of south-east Asia
Henry Baker Tristram (1822–1906), English clergyman and ornithologist who tried to reconcile evolution and creation
Robert Trivers (born 1943), American evolutionary biologist and sociobiologist known for the theories of reciprocal altruism and parental investment
Édouard Louis Trouessart (1842–1927), French naturalist who wrote Microbes, ferments and moulds
Frederick W. True (1858–1914), American naturalist who initially studied invertebrates, and later cetaceans 
George Washington Tryon Jr. (1838–1888), American malacologist, who named more than 5,600 new molluscs species
Chen-Lu Tsou (1923–2006), Chinese biochemist known for work on enzyme inactivation kinetics, and as the "face of Chinese biochemistry" in the west
Bernard Tucker (1901–1950), English ornithologist, a leader of the collaborative Oxford Bird Census in 1927
Edward Tuckerman (1817–1886), American botanist who studied lichens and other alpine plants
Endel Tulving (born 1927), Estonian-Canadian neuroscientist, known for his pioneering research on human memory
Marmaduke Tunstall (1743–1790), English ornithologist, author of Ornithologica Britannica
Ruth Turner (1915–2000), American marine biologist, expert on shipworms, wood-boring bivalve mollusks 
William Turton (1762–1835), British naturalist, author of A manual of the land and freshwater shells of the British Islands

U
 Jakob von Uexküll (1864–1944), Estonian biologist who discussed the relationship of animals with their environment, and founded biosemiotics
 Merton F. Utter (1917–1980), American microbiologist and biochemist known for work on intermediary metabolism

V

Va
Sebastien Vaillant (1669–1722), French botanist who studied plants in the Royal Garden
Achille Valenciennes (1794–1865), French zoologist who studied parasitic worms in humans
James W. Valentine (born 1926), American evolutionary biologist and Integrative Biologist
Pablo Valenzuela (born 1941), Chilean biochemist known for genetic studies of hepatitis viruses
Ruth van Heyningen (1917–2019), British biochemist known for her research on the lens and cataracts
Donald Van Slyke (1883–1971),  Dutch-American biochemist known for the measurement of gas and electrolyte levels in tissues
Francisco Varela (1946–2001), Chilean biologist known for introducing the concept of autopoiesis 
Nikolai Vavilov (1887–1943), Soviet botanist and geneticist, who defended "bourgeois pseudoscience" (genetics) against Lysenkoism
Damodaran M. Vasudevan (born 1942), Indian physician, immunologist and educationist, authority on allergy and immunology, also on cancer

Ve–Vr
Craig Venter (born 1946), American biotechnologist known for sequencing the human genome and transfecting a cell with a synthetic chromosome
Jules Verreaux (1807–1873), French botanist and ornithologist who collected plants and animals (including human remains) in Africa and Australia
Addison Emery Verrill (1839–1926), American zoologist who studied marine organisms
Louis Jean Pierre Vieillot (1748–1831), French ornithologist who studied changes in plumage, and studied live birds
Nicholas Aylward Vigors (1785–1840), Irish zoologist who popularized the classification of birds on the basis of the quinarian system
Rudolf Virchow (1821–1902), German biologist and pathologist, founder of cell theory, known as "the father of modern pathology"
Oswaldo Vital Brazil (1865–1950), Brazilian physician and immunobiologist, discoverer of several antivenoms against snake, scorpion and spider bites
Bert Vogelstein (born 1949), American geneticist, pioneer in cancer genomics
Karel Voous (1920–2002), Dutch ornithologist, author of Owls of the Northern Hemisphere
Mary Voytek (thesis 1995), American biogeochemist and microbial ecologist who has studied environmental controls on microbial transformations of nutrients
Hugo de Vries (1848–1935), Dutch botanist known for suggesting the concept of genes

W

Wa
Frans de Waal (born 1948), Dutch ethologist, primatologist and psychologist whose research centers on primate social behavior
Coslett Herbert Waddell (1858–1919), Irish priest and botanist known for work on difficult genera of flowering plants
Jeremy Wade (born 1960), British writer and TV presenter with a special interest in rivers and freshwater fish
Amy Wagers (thesis 1999), American biologist, stem cell and regenerative biology
Johann Georg Wagler (1800–1832), German herpetologist and ornithologist, author of Monographia Psittacorum
Warren H. Wagner (1920–2000), American botanist who developed an algorithm for analysing phylogenetic relationships between species
Göran Wahlenberg (1780–1851), Swedish naturalist who worked on plant geography, author of Flora lapponica 
Selman Waksman (1888–1973), American biochemist, awarded the Nobel Prize for work on antibiotics
Charles Athanase Walckenaer (1771–1852), French entomologist who placed the black widow in its current genus
George Wald (1906–1997), American biologist, winner of the 1967 Nobel Prize in Physiology or Medicine for his work on visual perception
John E. Walker (born 1941), British biochemist awarded the Nobel Prize for work on ATPases and ATP synthase
Alfred Russel Wallace (1823–1913), British naturalist and explorer, known for independently conceiving the theory of natural selection
Nathaniel Wallich (1786–1854), Danish botanist who described many Indian plant species
Benjamin Dann Walsh (1808–1869), British-American entomologist who studied agricultural insect pests
William Grey Walter (1910–1977), American-British neurophysiologist and roboticist who improved techniques of electroencephalography
James C. Wang (born 1938), Chinese-American biochemist who discovered topoisomerases
Deepal Warakagoda (born 1965), Sri Lankan ornithologist who identified new bird species of Sri Lanka
Otto Heinrich Warburg (1883–1970), German biochemist awarded the Nobel Prize for pioneering studies of respiration
J. Robin Warren (born 1937), Australian pathologist awarded the 2005 Nobel Prize for discovering that most stomach ulcers are caused by bacteria
Arieh Warshel (born 1940). Israeli-American biochemist awarded the Nobel Prize for computational studies of functional properties of biological molecules. 
Charles Waterton (1782–1865), English naturalist who introduced curare to Europe
James D. Watson (born 1928), American molecular biologist, awarded the Nobel Prize-winning for discovering the structure of DNA

We–Wh
Edwin C. Webb (1921–2006), British (later Australian) biochemist known for systematic classification of enzymes
Philip Barker Webb (1793–1854), English botanist, author of Histoire Naturelle des Iles Canaries
Hugh Algernon Weddell (1819–1877), English physician and botanist specializing in  South American flora
Jean Weigle (1901–1968), Swiss physicist and molecular biologist who worked on the interactions between bacteriophage λ and E. coli
Robert Weinberg (born 1942), American cancerologist who studies oncogenes and the genetic basis of cancer
August Weismann (1834–1914), German biologist who argued that inheritance only takes place by means of the germ cells
Friedrich Welwitsch (1806–1872), Austrian explorer and botanist who discovered the plant Welwitschia mirabilis in Angola
Karl Wernicke (1848–1905), German physician and neuroanatomist who discovered Wernicke's area
Hans Westerhoff (born 1953), Dutch biochemist known for work in systems biology and metabolic regulation
Victor Westhoff (1916–2001), Dutch botanist who published work on phytosociology and conservation
Alexander Wetmore (1886–1978), American ornithologist, author of A Systematic Classification for the Birds of the World
William Morton Wheeler (1865–1937), American entomologist and myrmecologist who studied the behavior and classification of ants
William Joseph Whelan (1924–2021) British-American biochemist noted for research on glycogen and as a founder of international unions such as the IUBMB
Gilbert White (1720–1795), English naturalist known for Natural History and Antiquities of Selborne
John White (c. 1756–1832), English botanist who studied the native flora and fauna of Australia

Wi–William
Robert Wiedersheim (1848–1923), German anatomist known for his list of 86 "vestigial organs" in The Structure of Man: An Index to His Past History
Maximilian zu Wied-Neuwied (1782–1867), German explorer and ethnologist, the first in Europe to show real images of Brazilian Indians
Hans Wiehler (1930–2003), German-American botanist who studied Gesneriaceae
Eric F. Wieschaus (born 1947), American developmental biologist awarded the Nobel Prize for work on the genetic control of embryonic development
Torsten Wiesel (born 1924), Swedish-American neurobiologist awarded the Nobel Prize for work on information processing in the visual system
Joan Wiffen (1922–2009), New Zealand paleontologist who discovered numerous dinosaur fossils in New Zealand 
Siouxsie Wiles (thesis about 2005), British microbiologist who studies how glowing bacteria help to understand microbial infections 
Maurice Wilkins (1916–2004). New Zealand and British x-ray crystallographer awarded the Nobel Prize for work on the structure of DNA
Carl Ludwig Willdenow (1765–1812), German botanist, pharmacist, and plant taxonomist, one of the founders of phytogeography
George C. Williams (1926–2010), American evolutionary biologist known for his criticism of group selection, and for introducing the gene-centric view of evolution
Mark Williamson (thesis 1958), British zoologist, expert on biological invasions

Willu–Wyn
Francis Willughby (1635–1672), English ornithologist and ichthyologist who introduced innovative and effective ways of classifying animals
Alexander Wilson (1766–1813), Scottish-American ornithologist, author of American Ornithology (nine volumes)
Allan Charles Wilson  (1934–1991), New Zealand biochemist and evolutionary biologist who pioneered molecular approaches to evolutionary changes and reconstructing phylogenies
David Sloan Wilson (born 1949), American evolutionary biologist who supports the concept of group selection
E. A. Wilson (1872–1912), English naturalist and artist who painted British birds and objects seen in Antarctica 
Edward O. Wilson (1929–2021), American entomologist and father of sociobiology, expert on ants, two-time winner of the Pulitzer Prize
Sergei Winogradsky (1856–1953), Russian microbiologist, ecologist and soil scientist who pioneered the cycle-of-life concept and studied nitrifying bacteria
Caspar Wistar (1761–1818), American anatomist and physician who developed anatomical models to assist in teaching anatomy
Henry Witherby (1873–1943), British ornithologist who introduced a bird-ringing scheme
William Withering (1741–1799), English botanist who introduced the use of digitalis, the active principle in foxgloves, as a remedy
Carl Woese (1928–2012), American microbiologist who used phylogenetic taxonomy of 16S ribosomal RNA to defined the Archaea as a new domain of life
Friedrich Wöhler (1800–1882), German chemist known for his synthesis of urea from ammonium cyanate (a nail in the coffin of vitalism) 
Lewis Wolpert (1929–2021), South-African-British developmental biologist known for the French flag model of embryonic development
Wong Siew Te (born 1969), Malaysian zoologist known for studies of the Malayan sun bear and efforts for its conservation
Flossie Wong-Staal (1947–2020), American virologist known for complete genetic mapping of HIV 
Dorothy Wrinch (1894–1976), British mathematical biologist who promoted the cyclol structure for proteins
V. C. Wynne-Edwards (1906–1997), Scottish zoologist known for advocacy of group selection, the theory that natural selection acts on groups

X
John Xantus de Vesey (1825–1894), Hungarian-American zoologist who collected natural history specimens for the United States National Museum

Y
 William Yarrell (1784–1856), English zoologist, author of The History of British Fishes and A History of British Birds
 Ada Yonath (born 1939), Israeli crystallographer  awarded the Nobel Prize for pioneering work on the structure of the ribosome
 J. Z. Young (1907–1997), British neurophysiologist who discovered the squid giant axon in the course of work on signal transmission in nerves

Z
Floyd Zaiger (1926–2020), American fruit geneticist who developed varieties of peaches, plums and other fruits
Eberhard August Wilhelm von Zimmermann (1743–1815), German zoologist who wrote one of the first works on the geographical distribution of mammals
Karl Alfred von Zittel (1839–1904), German palaeontologist, author of Handbuch der Palaeontologie
Joseph Gerhard Zuccarini (1797–1848), German botanist who described plants from Japan, Mexico and other places
Margarete Zuelzer (1877–1943), German zoologist who specialized in the study of protozoa

References

See also
List of biochemists
List of biogerontologists
List of botanists by author abbreviation
List of carcinologists
List of coleopterists
List of ecologists
List of herpetologists
List of malacologists
List of mammalogists
List of microbiologists
List of mycologists
List of ornithologists
List of pathologists
List of Russian biologists
List of zoologists by author abbreviation
List of Nobel Prize winners in physiology or medicine

 
List
List of biologists
List